= John Williams discography =

- Studio albums: 40
- Extended plays: 17
- Soundtrack albums: 111
- Live albums: 3
- Compilation albums: 36
- Singles: 82
- Video albums: 9
- Expanded reissue soundtrack albums: 60
- Collaborations and Featurings: 118
- Other album appearances: 107

John Williams, a composer formerly credited as Johnny Williams, initially worked as a jazz pianist and studio musician before transitioning into composing for television and film. Throughout his career, he has often conducted his own compositions whenever possible.

With a career spanning over 65 years, Williams has garnered five Academy Awards: four for Best Original Score (Jaws, Star Wars, E.T. the Extra-Terrestrial, Schindler's List) and one for Best Scoring: Adaptation and Original Song Score (Fiddler on the Roof). He has also received four Golden Globe Awards, seven British Academy Film Awards, 23 Grammy Awards, and numerous gold and platinum records.

This article provides a comprehensive list of works performed by John Williams and the ensembles he has conducted throughout his career, including the London Symphony Orchestra and the Boston Pops Orchestra, for which he served as the music director from 1980 to 1993. Additionally, there is a dedicated section highlighting his discography as a composer, featuring many compositions that he himself did not record.

For a complete list of his compositions, please refer to the List of compositions by John Williams.

== Albums ==
=== Studio albums ===
Year	Album	Label	Notes and remarks
1957	The John Towner Touch	Kapp	John Towner Williams, piano; reissued in the 2006 compilation Jazz Beginnings, Fresh Sound Records.
1957	World on a String	Bethlehem	Arranged by John Williams; piano by John Williams; reissued in 1984 as The John Williams Band Plays the Music of Harold Arlen, Discovery Records; reissued in 1986, Discovery records; reissued in the 2006 compilation Jazz Beginnings, Fresh Sound Records; reissued in 2015 as World on a String, Bethlehem Records.
1957	The Johnny Williams Orchestra Plays Sounds from Screen Spectaculars	Craftsmen	Arranged and Conducted by John Williams; piano by John Williams, Hollywood Grand Studio Orchestra; reissued in 1958 as Bigs Hits from Columbia Pictures, Tops, 10 tracks; reissued in 1958 as Bigs Hits from Columbia Pictures, Golden Tone, 8 tracks, stereo; reissued in 1958 as Bigs Hits from Columbia Pictures, Mayfair, 10 tracks, stereo; reissued in 1996 as Movie Memories [Big Hits], Simitar/Pickwick, 10 tracks, stereo; Reissued for digital download in 2012, Simitar
1961	Rhythm in Motion	Columbia	Conducted by Johnny Williams; also released in 1961, Columbia, stereo; reissued in the 2006 compilation Checkmate/Rhythm in Motion, Film Score Monthly; Reissued for digital download in 2015, Jasnet Records
1980	Boston Pops: Pops in Space	Philips	Reissued in 1985, Philips; Reissued for digital download in 2014, Universal
1980	Boston Pops: Pops on the March	Philips	Reissued in 1985, Philips.
1981	Boston Pops: That's Entertainment	Philips	Reissued in 1985, Philips; Reissued for digital download in 2014, Universal
1981	Boston Pops: We Wish You a Merry Christmas	Philips	Reissued in 1985, Philips; Reissued for digital download in 2014, Decca.
1982	Boston Pops: Pops Around the World – Digital Overtures	Philips	Rereleased in 1982, Philips; Reissued for digital download in 2014, Universal
1982	Boston Pops: Aisle Seat – Great Film Music	Philips	Rereleased in 1983, Philips; Reissued for digital download in 2014, Decca.
1983	Boston Pops: Out of this World	Philips	Rereleased in 1983, Philips; Reissued for digital download in 2014, Decca.
1984	Boston Pops: On Stage	Philips	Rereleased in 1984, Philips; Reissued for digital download in 2014, Universal
1984	Boston Pops: Peter and the Wolf/Nutcracker Suite	Philips	Narration by Dudley Moore (US); International editions : narration by Christoph Rueger (DE) (coupled with Le Carnaval des Animaux, dir. André Previn), narration by Terry Wogan (GB), narration by Leoni Jansen (NL), narration by Pierre Perret (F), narration by Stephan Remmler (D); Reissued for digital download in 2014 (Dudley Moore, Terry Wogan), Decca.
1985	Boston Pops: Swing, Swing, Swing	Philips	Rereleased in 1985, Philips Digital Classics; Reissued for digital download in 2014, Universal
1985	Boston Pops: America, The Dream Goes On	Philips	The lead vocals on the title selection (whose lyrics were written by Alan Bergman and Marilyn Bergman) are performed by James Ingram; Rereleased in 1985, Philips; Reissued for digital download in 2014, Decca.
1986	Boston Pops: Bernstein by Boston	Philips	Rereleased in 1986, Philips; Reissued for digital download in 2014, Decca.
1987	Boston Pops: Pops in Love	Philips	Rereleased in 1987, Philips; Reissued for digital download in 2014, Decca.
1987	Boston Pops: Holst – The Planets	Philips	Rereleased in 1987, Philips; Reissued for digital download in 2014, Decca.
1988	Boston Pops: Digital Jukebox	Philips	Rereleased in 1988, Philips; Reissued for digital download in 2014, Universal
1989	Boston Pops: Pops Britannia	Philips	Reissued for digital download in 2014, Decca.
1989	Boston Pops: Salute to Hollywood	Philips	Reissued for digital download in 2014, Universal
1990	Boston Pops: Pops a la Russe	Philips	Reissued for digital download in 2014, Decca.
1990	Boston Pops: Pops by George – The Music of Gershwin	Philips	Misha Dichter, piano; Rereleased in 1990 "Pops by Gershwin", Philips.
1990	Boston Pops: Music of the Night	Sony Classical	Reissued for digital download in 2017, Sony Classical.
1990	John Williams Conducts John Williams – The Star Wars Trilogy	Sony Classical	New recordings, recorded digitally at Skywalker Ranch (California) with the Skywalker Symphony Orchestra; Composed and Conducted by John Williams; Reissued for digital download in 2017, Sony Classical.
1991	Boston Pops: The Spielberg/Williams Collaboration	Sony Classical	Composed and Conducted by John Williams; Theme from Sugarland Express: Toots Thielemans, Harmonica; Reissued in 2009 X2: The Spielberg/Williams Collaboration / The Hollywood Sound, Sony Music Distribution; Reissued for digital download in 2017, Sony Classical.
1991	Boston Pops: I Love a Parade	Sony Classical	
1992	Boston Pops: The Green Album	Sony Classical	
1992	Boston Pops: Joy to the World	Sony Classical	Reissued for digital download in 2017, Sony Classical.
1993	Boston Pops: Night and Day – Celebrate Sinatra	Sony Classical	
1993	Boston Pops: Unforgettable	Sony Classical	
1994	Boston Pops: Music for Stage and Screen	Sony Classical	The Reivers: narration by Burgess Meredith.
1994	Boston Pops: It Don't Mean a Thing If It Ain't Got That Swing!	Sony Classical	With special guest Nancy Wilson
1995	Boston Pops: Williams on Williams – Classic Spielberg Scores	Sony Classical	Composed and conducted by John Williams.
1996	Boston Pops: Summon the Heroes	Sony Classical	Also reissued as The Sound Of Glory in Europe, Sony Classical.; Reissued for digital download in 2010, Sony Classical.
1997	The Five Sacred Trees	Sony Classical	London Symphony Orchestra with Judith LeClair.
1997	The Hollywood Sound	Sony Classical	London Symphony Orchestra with Grover Washington, Jr.; reissued in 2009 X2: The Spielberg/Williams Collaboration / The Hollywood Sound, Sony Music Distribution; Reissued for digital download in 2015, Sony Classical.
2001	Treesong	Deutsche Grammophon	Boston Symphony Orchestra with Gil Shaham; Reissued for digital download in 2005, Deutsche Grammophon
2002	American Journey: Winter Olympics 2002	Sony Classical	International pressings exist under the title Call of the Champions; also issued as a promo CD containing radio edits and interviews with John Williams (2002).
2017	The Spielberg/Williams Collaboration Part III	Sony Classical	Digital release; composed and conducted by John Williams; Reissued for digital download in 2017, Sony Classical.

=== Soundtrack albums / Motion Picture Scores composed and conducted by John Williams ===
Year	Album	Label	Notes and remarks
1960	Checkmate [Original Music from The CBS-TV Show]	Columbia	Re-recording; composed and conducted by Johnny Williams; also released in 1960, Columbia, stereo; reissued in the 2006 compilation Checkmate/Rhythm in Motion, Film Score Monthly; Reissued for digital download in 2012, Soundtrack Classics
1963	Diamond Head [Music from the Motion Picture]	Colpix Records	Re-recording; composed and conducted by John Williams, except the main theme composed by Hugo Winterhalter; also released in 1963, Colpix Records, stereo; reissued in the 2006 compilation Diamond Head/Gone With the Wave, Film Score Monthly; Reissued for digital download in 2011, Master Classics Records
1966	How to Steal a Million [Original Motion Picture Score]	20th Century Fox Records	Re-recording; composed and conducted by John Williams; also released in 1966, 20th Century Fox Records, stereo; reissued in 2008 How to Steal a Million/Bachelor Flat, Intrada Special Collection; Reissued for digital download in 2015, TP4 Music
1966	Not With My Wife, You Don't! [Original Motion Picture Soundtrack Album]	Warner Bros. Records	Re-recording; composed and conducted by John Williams; also released in 1966, Warner Bros. Records, stereo; reissued in 2006, Film Score Monthly.
1966	Penelope [Original Music from the MGM Film]	MGM Records	Re-recording; composed and conducted by John Williams; also released in 1966, MGM Records, stereo; reissued in the 2004 compilation Penelope/Bachelor in Paradise, Film Score Monthly.
1967	Fitzwilly [Original Motion Picture Score]	United Artists	Re-recording; composed and conducted by John Williams; also released in 1967, United Artists Records, stereo; reissued in the 2004 compilation Fitzwilly/The Long Goodbye, Varèse Sarabande CD Club. Credited as "Johnny Williams".
1967	Valley of the Dolls [Music from the Motion Picture Soundtrack]	20th Century Fox Records	Songs by Dory and André Previn; music composed, adapted and conducted by Johnny Williams; also released in 1967, 20th Century Fox Records, stereo; reissued in 1998, Philips; Reissued for digital download in 2017, UMG Recordings
1968	Heidi [Original Soundtrack Recording]	Capitol	Composed and conducted by John Williams.
1969	Goodbye, Mr. Chips [Original Motion Picture Soundtrack]	MGM Records	Music and lyrics by Leslie Bricusse; music supervised and conducted by John Williams; also issued for promo in 1969, containing some alternates cues.
1969	The Reivers [Original Score]	Columbia	Composed and conducted by John Williams; reissued in 1990, Masters Film Music/Canada.
1971	Jane Eyre [Music from the Omnibus/Sagittarius Production]	Capitol	Composed and conducted by John Williams; reissued in 2012, La-La Land Records.
1971	Fiddler on the Roof [Original Motion Picture Soundtrack Recording]	United Artists	Violin solos by Isaac Stern; music for stage play and film by Jerry Bock; music adapted and conducted by John Williams; reissued in 1984, EMI; Reissued for digital download in 2015, Capitol Records
1972	Images [The Original Sound Track Recording]	Hemdale Music/BMI	Promo; percussion: Stomu Yamashta; composed and conducted by John Williams; reissued in 2007, Prometheus/Belgium; reissued for digital download in 2012, BSX Records; Reissued in 2021, Quartet Records.
1973	Tom Sawyer [Original Motion Picture Soundtrack]	United Artists	Music and lyrics by Richard M. and Robert B. Sherman; music adapted and conducted by John Williams.
1973	Cinderella Liberty [Original Motion Picture Soundtrack]	20th Century Records	Composed and conducted by John Williams; harmonica solos by Toots Thielemans; reissued in 2008, Intrada Special Collection.
1974	Earthquake [Music from the Original Motion Picture Soundtrack]	MCA Records	Re-recording; Composed and conducted by John Williams; reissued in 1990, Varèse Sarabande, and in 2019 by La-La-Land Records.
1974	The Towering Inferno [Original Motion Picture Soundtrack]	Warner Bros. Records	Composed and conducted by John Williams; reissued for digital download in 2014, Rhino. Rereleased in 2019 by La-La-Land Records.
1975	The Eiger Sanction [Music from the Original Motion Picture Soundtrack]	MCA Records	Re-recording; Composed and conducted by John Williams; reissued in 1991, Varèse Sarabande.
1975	Jaws [Music from the Original Motion Picture Soundtrack]	MCA Records	Re-recording; Composed, conducted and produced by John Williams; rereleased in 1975, MCA Records; reissued in 1980, MCA Records; reissued in 1992, MCA Records; reissued in 2015 as a LP, Geffen Records; reissued for digital download in 2015, Geffen Records.
1976	The Missouri Breaks [Original MGM Motion Picture Soundtrack]	United Artists	Re-recording; composed and conducted by John Williams.
1977	Star Wars [Original Motion Picture Soundtrack]	20th Century Records	2 LPs; composed and conducted by John Williams; rereleased in 1977, 20th Century Records; reissued in 1977, RSO; reissued in 1986, Polydor; reissued in 2016 as 2-LP "Limited Edition Gold Vinyl", Sony; reissued in 2016 as 2-LP "Limited Edition Picture Disc", Super Deluxe Edition; Reissued for digital download in 2017, Walt Disney Records; reissued in 2017 as 3-LP Star Wars: A New Hope 40th Anniversary Box Set, Walt Disney Records; Reissued in 2018, Walt Disney Records, Remastered.
1977	Close Encounters of the Third Kind [Original Motion Picture Soundtrack]	Arista	Composed, conducted and produced by John Williams; also issued for promo with a complimentary single, Arista; rereleased in 1977, Arista; rereleased in 1977, Arista; reissued in 1988, Arista Records; reissued in 1990, Varèse Sarabande; reissued in 2004 as a DVD-audio, Classic Records; reissued in 2015 as a SACD, Audio Fidelity.
1978	The Fury [Original Soundtrack Recording]	Arista	Re-recording; composed, conducted and produced by John Williams; also issued for promo in 1978, Arista; reissued in 1990, Varèse Sarabande, and in 2017 by La-La-Land Records.
1978	Jaws 2 [The Original Motion Picture Soundtrack]	MCA Records	Composed, conducted and produced by John Williams; reissued in 1990, Varèse Sarabande; reissued for digital download in 2015, Geffen.
1978	Superman: The Movie Original Sound Track	Warner Bros. Records	2 LPs; composed, conducted and produced by John Williams; reissued partially in 1987, Warner Bros. Records; reissued in 1990, Warner Bros. Records/Japan.
1979	Dracula [Original Motion Picture Soundtrack]	MCA Records	Composed, conducted and produced by John Williams; reissued in 1990, Varèse Sarabande.
1979	1941 [Original Motion Picture Soundtrack]	Arista	Composed, conducted and produced by John Williams; reissued in 1990, Bay Cities; reissued in 1997, Varèse Sarabande, and in 2014 by La-La-Land Records.
1980	Star Wars: The Empire Strikes Back [The Original Soundtrack from the Motion Picture]	RSO	2 LPs; composed and conducted by John Williams; reissued in 1980, Polydor; also issued partially for promo in 1980, RSO; reissued partially in 1985, Polydor; reissued in 2016 as 2-LP "Limited Edition Gold Vinyl", Sony; reissued for digital download in 2017, Walt Disney Records; Reissued in 2018, Walt Disney Records, Remastered.
1981	Raiders of the Lost Ark [Original Motion Picture Soundtrack]	Columbia	Composed, conducted and produced by John Williams; Reissued in 1981, Polydor; Reissued in 1985, Polydor/Germany. Reissued in 2024, Walt Disney Records.
1982	E.T.: The Extra-Terrestrial [Music from the Original Motion Picture Soundtrack]	MCA Records	Mainly featuring concert arrangements based on the film's music (not a re-recording); Composed and Conducted by John Williams; Rereleased in 1982, MCA Records, Picture Disc; Rereleased in 1982, MCA Records Audiophile; Reissued in 1985, MCA Records/Japan; Reissued two times in 1987 with two different covers, MCA Records; Reissued in 2015 as a LP, Geffen Records; Reissued for digital download in 2015, Geffen Records; Reissued in 2017 as "E.T. The Extra - Terrestrial: 35th Anniversary Limited Edition [4K Ultra HD + Blu-ray + Digital HD + CD]", Universal Studios Home Entertainment, Remastered.
1982	Monsignor [from the 20th Century Film]	Casablanca	Composed, conducted and produced by John Williams; Reissued in 2007, Intrada Special Collection.
1983	Star Wars: Return of the Jedi [The Original Motion Picture Soundtrack]	RSO	Composed and Conducted by John Williams; Rereleased in 1983, RSO; Reissued in 1983, Polydor; Reissued in 1986, Polydor; Reissued in 2016 "Limited Edition Gold Vinyl", Sony; Reissued for digital download in 2017, Walt Disney Records; Reissued in 2018, Walt Disney Records, Remastered.
1984	Indiana Jones and the Temple of Doom [The Original Motion Picture Soundtrack]	Polydor	Composed, conducted and produced by John Williams; Rereleased in 1984, Polydor; Reissued in 1985, Polydor. Reissued in 2024, Walt Disney Records.
1984	The River [Original Soundtrack Recording]	MCA Records	Mainly featuring concert arrangements based on the film's music (not a re-recording); Composed, conducted and produced by John Williams; Reissued in 1991, Varèse Sarabande, and in 2020 by Intrada.
1986	SpaceCamp [Original Motion Picture Soundtrack]	RCA Victor	Composed and conducted by John Williams; Reissued in 2010, Intrada, Special Collection; Reissued in 2014, Intrada.
1987	The Witches of Eastwick [Original Motion Picture Soundtrack]	Warner Bros. Records	Composed, conducted and produced by John Williams; Rereleased in 1987, Warner Bros. Records; Reissued in 2006, Collectors' Choice Music; Reissued in 2012, Perseverance Records; Reissued for digital download in 2015, Rhino/Warner Bros.
1987	Empire of the Sun [Original Motion Picture Soundtrack]	Warner Bros. Records	Composed, conducted and produced by John Williams; choir conductor: Janine Wagner; rereleased in 1987, Warner Bros. Records; rereleased in 1987, Warner Bros. Records; Reissued for digital download in 2010, Warner Bros.
1988	The Accidental Tourist [Original Motion Picture Soundtrack]	Warner Bros. Records	Composed, conducted and produced by John Williams; rereleased in 1989, Warner Bros. Records; reissued in 2008, Film Score Monthly; reissued for digital download in 2016, Rhino/Warner Bros.
1989	Indiana Jones and the Last Crusade [Original Motion Picture Soundtrack]	Warner Bros. Records	Composed, conducted and produced by John Williams; also issued for promo in 1989, Warner Bros. Records. Reissued in 2024, Walt Disney Records.
1989	Born on the Fourth of July [Motion Picture Soundtrack Album]	MCA Records	Composed, conducted and produced by John Williams; rereleased in 1989, MCA Records; Reissued for digital download in 2016, Geffen Records
1990	Always [Motion Picture Soundtrack Album]	MCA Records	Composed, conducted and produced by John Williams; rereleased in 1990, MCA Records.
1990	Stanley & Iris [Original Motion Picture Soundtrack]	Varèse Sarabande	Composed and Conducted by John Williams; Reissued in 1990, Varèse Sarabande.
1990	Presumed Innocent [Original Motion Picture Soundtrack]	Colosseum VSD	Composed, conducted and produced by John Williams; Rereleased in 1990, Varèse Sarabande.
1990	Home Alone [Original Motion Picture Soundtrack]	CBS	Composed, conducted and produced by John Williams; Reissued in 2015 Home Alone 25th anniversary Edition, Sony; Reissued in 2015 as 2-LP (two different versions), Mondo Records; Reissued for digital download in 2015 Home Alone 25th anniversary Edition, Masterworks
1991	Hook [Original Motion Picture Soundtrack]	Epic Records	Composed, conducted and produced by John Williams; Reissued in 1991, Epic Soundtrax, in 2011 by La-La-Land Records and in 2022 as 30th Anniversary Edition by Mondo Records.
1992	JFK [Original Motion Picture Soundtrack]	Elektra	Composed and Conducted by John Williams.
1992	Far and Away [Original Motion Picture Soundtrack]	MCA Records	Composed, conducted and produced by John Williams.
1992	Home Alone 2 – Lost in New York [Original Soundtrack Album]	Fox Records	Composed, conducted and produced by John Williams.
1993	Jurassic Park [Original Motion Picture Soundtrack]	MCA Records	Composed and Produced by John Williams; Co-Conducted by John Williams and Artie Kane (uncredited); Rereleased in 1993 with Picture Disc, MCA Records; Reissued for digital download in 2013, Geffen; Reissued in 2014 as 2-LP (two different versions), Mondo Records; Repress in 2015, Mondo Records.
1993	Schindler's List [Music from the Original Motion Picture Soundtrack]	MCA Records	Violin Solos by Itzhak Perlman; composed and conducted by John Williams; Reissued in 1995 as a 24k Gold Disc, remastered, MCA Records; Reissued for digital download in 2011, Geffen Records; Reissued in 2016 as a K2 HD CD, remastered, MCA Records/Japan. Rereleased in 2018 by La-La-Land Records.
1994	The Cowboys [Original Motion Picture Soundtrack] (1972)	Varèse Sarabande	Previously unreleased score; composed and conducted by John Williams; reissued for digital download in 2014, Varèse Sarabande.
1995	Sabrina [Original Motion Picture Soundtrack]	A&M Records	Composed and conducted by John Williams.
1995	Nixon [Original Motion Picture Soundtrack]	Illusion Records/Hollywood Records	Composed, conducted and produced by John Williams; also issued in 1995 as "For Your Consideration" Academy promo CD, Cinergi Pictures Entertainment Inc., Cinergi Production Inc., Buena Vista Pictures Distribution Inc.
1996	E.T.: The Extra-Terrestrial [Original Motion Picture Soundtrack] (1982)	MCA Records	First representation of the original score as it contains very few previously released material from the 1982 album; Composed and conducted by John Williams.
1996	Sleepers [Original Motion Picture Soundtrack]	Philips	Composed, conducted and produced by John Williams.
1997	Rosewood [Music from the Motion Picture]	Sony Classical	Composed, conducted and produced by John Williams; Reissued for digital download in 2016, Sony Classical. Rereleased in 2019 by La-La-Land Records.
1997	The Lost World: Jurassic Park [Original Motion Picture Score]	MCA Records	Composed, conducted and produced by John Williams; reissued for digital download in 2012, Geffen.
1997	Seven Years in Tibet [Original Motion Picture Soundtrack]	Mandalay Records	Cello solos by Yo-Yo Ma; composed, conducted and produced by John Williams; reissued in 2016 as a 2-LP, Music On Vinyl.
1997	Amistad [Original Motion Picture Soundtrack]	DreamWorks	Composed, conducted and produced by John Williams; reissued for digital download in 2014, Geffen.
1997	Lost in Space, Vol. 1 [Original Television Soundtrack] (1965)	GNP Crescendo	Previously unreleased score; composed and conducted by John Williams.
1998	Saving Private Ryan [Music from the Original Motion Picture Soundtrack]	DreamWorks	Composed, conducted and produced by John Williams; also issued for promo in 1998, DreamWorks Records; reissued for digital download in 2014, Geffen. Rereleased in 2018 by La-La-Land Records.
1998	Stepmom	Sony Classical/Soundtrax	Original motion picture soundtrack; guitar solos by Christopher Parkening; composed, conducted and produced by John Williams; also issued in 1998 as "For Your Consideration" Academy promo HDCD, Columbia Pictures.
1998	The Poseidon Adventure/The Paper Chase [Original Motion Picture Soundtrack] (1972/1973)	Film Score Monthly	Previously unreleased scores; also includes the previously unreleased "Main Title" to Conrack (1974); composed and conducted by John Williams.
1999	Star Wars: Episode I – The Phantom Menace [Original Motion Picture Soundtrack]	Sony Classical	Composed, conducted and produced by John Williams; "John Williams Interview for Radio" promo CD released in 1999, Sony Classical, and reissued in 2000 (Ultimate Edition).; reissued in 2015 as 2-LP, I Am Shark; reissued for digital download in 2017, Walt Disney Records; Reissued in 2018, Walt Disney Records, Remastered.
1999	Angela's Ashes [Music from the Motion Picture]	Sony Classical	Narration by Andrew Bennett; conducted and produced by John Williams; also issued in 1999 as a "For Your Consideration" promo CD, but without Andrew Bennett's narration, Sony Classical.; also released in Europe in 1999, without Andrew Bennett's narration, Decca
2000	Jaws [The Collector's Edition Soundtrack] (1975)	Decca	Anniversary collector's edition, previously unreleased score; composed and conducted by John Williams.
2000	A Guide for the Married Man [Original Motion Picture Soundtrack] (1967)	Film Score Monthly	Previously unreleased score; composed and conducted by John Williams.
2000	The Patriot [Original Motion Picture Score]	Centropolis Records/Hollywood Records	Composed, conducted and produced by John Williams.
2001	Heartbeeps [Original Motion Picture Soundtrack] (1981)	Varèse Sarabande CD Club	Previously unreleased score; composed and conducted by John Williams; reissued for digital download in 2014, Varèse Sarabande.
2001	A.I. Artificial Intelligence [Music from the Motion Picture]	Warner Sunset/Warner Bros. Records	Also issued as a promo 2-CD set (2001) and "For Your Consideration" Academy promo CD (2001); rereleased in 2001 as a DVD-Audio, Warner Sunset Records; composed, conducted and produced by John Williams.
2001	Harry Potter and the Sorcerer's Stone [Original Motion Picture Soundtrack]	Warner Sunset/Nonesuch/Atlantic	Composed, conducted and produced by John Williams; also issued in 2001 as "For Your Consideration" Academy promo CD, Atlantic; Reissued for digital download in 2005, atlantic Records; Reissued in 2018 as 2-LP, Nonesuch/Warner Sunset Records
2001	John Goldfarb, Please Come Home [Original Motion Picture Soundtrack] (1965)	Film Score Monthly	Previously unreleased score; composed and conducted by John Williams.
2002	Star Wars: Episode II – Attack of the Clones [Original Motion Picture Soundtrack]	Sony Classical	Composed, conducted and produced by John Williams; "John Williams: Jedi Maestro" promo CD released in 2002, Sony Classical.; reissued in 2016 as 2-LP I Am Shark; reissued for digital download in 2017, Walt Disney Records; Reissued in 2018, Walt Disney Records, Remastered.
2002	Minority Report [Original Motion Picture Score]	DreamWorks	Composed, conducted and produced by John Williams; reissued for digital download in 2014, Geffen. Rereleased in 2019 by La-La-Land Records.
2002	Catch Me If You Can [Music from the Motion Picture]	DreamWorks	Composed, conducted and produced by John Williams; also issued in 2002 as a "For Your Consideration" promo CD, DreamWorks Pictures; reissued for digital download in 2014, Geffen.
2002	The Fury (1978)	Varèse Sarabande CD Club	The Deluxe Edition 2-CD set features the previously unreleased original score, along with the remastered original album recorded by the London Symphony Orchestra; composed and conducted by John Williams.
2002	The Man Who Loved Cat Dancing [Original Motion Picture Soundtrack] (1973)	Film Score Monthly	Previously unreleased score; composed and conducted by John Williams.
2004	Harry Potter and the Prisoner of Azkaban [Original Motion Picture Soundtrack]	Warner Sunset/Nonesuch/Atlantic	Composed, conducted and produced by John Williams; also issued in 2004 as "For Your Consideration" Academy promo CD, Warner Bros; Reissued for digital download in 2005, Warner Sunset/Nonesuch/Atlantic; Reissued in 2018 as 2-LP, Nonesuch/Warner Sunset Records
2004	The Terminal [Original Motion Picture Soundtrack]	Decca	Composed, conducted and produced by John Williams; also issued in 2004 as a "For Your Consideration" promo CD, DreamWorks Pictures; Reissued for digital download in 2007, Universal
2004	Fitzwilly/The Long Goodbye [Original Motion Picture Soundtrack] (1967/1973)	Varèse Sarabande CD Club	The Long Goodbye: previously unreleased score; composed and conducted by John Williams.
2004	Penelope/Bachelor in Paradise [Original Motion Picture Soundtrack] (1966/1961)	Film Score Monthly	Previously unreleased original scores; Penelope's music composed and conducted by John Williams.
2005	Star Wars: Episode III – Revenge of the Sith [Original Motion Picture Soundtrack]	Sony Classical	Composed, conducted and produced by John Williams; Reissued in 2016 as 2-LP, I Am Shark; Reissued for digital download in 2017, Walt Disney Records; Reissued in 2018, Walt Disney Records, Remastered.
2005	War of the Worlds [Music from the Motion Picture]	Decca/Universal	Composed, conducted and produced by John Williams; Also issued in 2005 as "For Your Consideration" Academy Promo CD, Paramount; Reissued for digital download in 2017, Decca
2005	Memoirs of a Geisha [Original Motion Picture Soundtrack]	Sony Classical	Cello solos by Yo-Yo Ma, violin solos by Itzhak Perlman; composed and conducted by John Williams; also issued in 2005 as "For Your Consideration" Academy Promo CD, Sony; Reissued in 2012, Sony Classical., remastered; Reissued for digital download in 2013, Sony Classical., Remastered; Reissued as 2-LP in 2016, Music On Vinyl.
2005	Munich [Original Motion Picture Soundtrack]	Decca Classics	Composed, conducted and produced by John Williams; also issued in 2005 as "For Your Consideration" Academy promo CD, DreamWorks/Universal; Reissued for digital download in 2005, Universal
2005	Jericho/The Ghostbreaker [Original Television Soundtrack] (1966/1965)	Film Score Monthly	Previously unreleased scores; The Ghostbreaker's music composed and conducted by John Williams.
2008	How to Steal a Million/Bachelor Flat (1966/1962)	Intrada Special Collection	2-CD set, previously unreleased original score; composed and conducted by John Williams; Reissued for digital download in 2015 "How to Steal a Million - OST" & "How to Steal a Million - The Film Recordings", TP4 Music
2008	Indiana Jones and the Kingdom of the Crystal Skull [Original Motion Picture Soundtrack]	Concord Records	Composed, conducted and produced by John Williams; Reissued for digital download in 2008, Concord Music Group. Reissued in 2024, Walt Disney Records.
2010	Black Sunday [Music from the Motion Picture] (1977)	Film Score Monthly	Previously unreleased score; reissued on 2xLP in 2015, Mondo Records; reissued for digital download in 2016, La-La Land Records.
2010	Family Plot (1976)	Varèse Sarabande CD Club	Previously unreleased score; composed and conducted by John Williams.
2011	Midway [Original Motion Picture Soundtrack] (1976)	Varèse Sarabande CD Club	Previously unreleased score; composed by John Williams; co-conducted by John Williams and Robert O. Ragland.
2011	Not With My Wife, You Don't, Vol. 2 — Original Soundtrack (1966)	Film Score Monthly	Previously unreleased original score; composed and conducted by John Williams.
2011	Nightwatch/Killer by Night [Original Television Soundtrack] (1965/1972)	Film Score Monthly	Previously unreleased scores; Nighwatch's music composed and conducted by John Williams.
2011	The Adventures of Tintin: The Secret of the Unicorn [Music from the Motion Picture]	Sony Classical	Composed, conducted and produced by John Williams; Reissued for digital download in 2011, Sony Classical.; Also issued in 2011 as a "For Your Consideration" promo CD, Paramount Pictures; reissued in 2018 as 2-LP, Music On Vinyl.
2011	War Horse [Original Motion Picture Soundtrack]	Sony Classical	Composed, conducted and produced by John Williams; Reissued for digital download in 2011, Sony Classical.; Also issued in 2011 as a "For Your Consideration" promo CD, DreamWorks II Distribution Co.
2012	Lincoln [Original Motion Picture Soundtrack]	Sony Classical	Composed and conducted by John Williams; Reissued for digital download in 2012, Sony Classical.; Also issued in 2012 as a "For Your Consideration" promo CD, DreamWorks II Distribution Co.; reissued in 2017 as 2-LP, Music On Vinyl.
2013	The Missouri Breaks [An Original MGM Motion Picture Soundtrack] (1976)	Kritzerland Records	2-CD set, previously unreleased original score; composed and conducted by John Williams.
2013	Fitzwilly – Special Archival Edition [Original MGM Motion Picture Soundtrack] (1967)	Music Box Records	Previously unreleased original score; composed and conducted by John Williams.
2013	The Book Thief [Original Motion Picture Soundtrack]	Sony Masterworks	Composed, conducted and produced by John Williams; Reissued for digital download in 2013, Sony Classical.; Also issued in 2013 as a "For Your Consideration" promo CD, Twentieth Century Fox.
2015	Star Wars: The Force Awakens [Original Motion Picture Soundtrack]	Walt Disney Records	Composed by John Williams; co-conducted by John Williams, William Ross and Gustavo Dudamel; also released in 2015 as a Target Edition and for digital download; also issued in 2015 as a "For Your Consideration" Academy promo album available on CD and for downloading, Walt Disney Records; reissued in 2016 as 2-LP, Walt Disney Records; reissued in 2016 as 2-LP "Hologram vinyl", Walt Disney Records; reissued in 2017 as 2-LP Limited Collector's Edition with 4 collectable covers, I Am Shark; Reissued for digital download in 2018, Lucasfilm.
2016	The BFG [Original Motion Picture Soundtrack]	Walt Disney Records	Composed and conducted by John Williams; Reissued for digital download in 2016, Walt Disney; Also issued in 2016 as a "For Your Consideration" Academy promo album available on CD, Walt Disney Records
2017	Stanley & Iris: The Deluxe Edition/Pete 'n' Tillie [Original Motion Picture Soundtrack] (1990/1972)	Varèse Sarabande	Stanley & Iris: includes previously unreleased material; Pete 'n' Tillie: previously unreleased score; composed and conducted by John Williams.
2017	Star Wars: The Last Jedi [Original Motion Picture Soundtrack]	Walt Disney Records	Composed and produced by John Williams; co-conducted by John Williams, William Ross and Gustavo Dudamel; Walt Disney Records; Reissued for digital download in 2017, Lucasfilm; Also issued in 2017 as a "For Your Consideration" Academy promo album available on CD and for downloading, Walt Disney Records; reissued in 2018 as 2-LP, Walt Disney Records.
2017	The Post [Original Motion Picture Soundtrack]	Sony Classical	Composed and conducted by John Williams; Reissued for digital download in 2017, Sony Classical.; Also issued in 2017 as a "For Your Consideration" promo CD, Sony; reissued in 2018 as LP, Music On Vinyl.
2019	Disaster Movie Soundtrack Collection - Music by John Williams: The Poseidon Adventure (1972) / The Towering Inferno (1974) / Earthquake (1974)	La-La Land Records	Composed, conducted and produced by John Williams; Contains previously unreleased material; Earthquake: Previously unreleased original score.
2019	Star Wars: The Rise of Skywalker [Original Motion Picture Soundtrack]	Walt Disney Records	Composed, conducted and produced by John Williams; Walt Disney Records; Also issued in 2019 as a "For Your Consideration" Academy promo album available on CD and for downloading, Walt Disney Records. Final Star Wars film he composed.
2020	The River - Expanded Original Motion Picture Soundtrack (1984)	Intrada	2-CD set, First representation of the original score as it contains very few previously released material from the 1984 album; composed and conducted by John Williams.
2021	The Eiger Sanction - Expanded Original Motion Picture Soundtrack (1975)	Intrada	2-CD set, Premiere release of the original film score recording plus remastered original soundtrack recording; composed and conducted by John Williams.
2022	The Fabelmans [Original Motion Picture Soundtrack]	Sony Classical	Composed and conducted by John Williams;
2023	Indiana Jones and the Dial of Destiny [Original Motion Picture Soundtrack]	Walt Disney Records	Composed and conducted by John Williams
2024	The Sugarland Express - Original Motion Picture Soundtrack (1974)	La-La Land Records	Premiere release of the score; composed and conducted by John Williams.
2026	Disclosure Day [Original Motion Picture Soundtrack]	Back Lot Music	Composed and conducted by John Williams

=== Live albums ===
Year	Album	Label	Notes and remarks
2021	John Williams & The Presidents Own	Marjer Music	Music composed and conducted by John Williams/The United States Marine Band; Live recording; Digital release.
2022	The Berlin Concert	Deutsche Grammophon	2-CD set, Music composed and conducted by John Williams/The Berliner Philharmoniker; Live recording.
2023	John Williams & The Presidents Own	Marjer Music	2-CD set, Music composed and conducted by John Williams/The Presidents Own; Live recording; Digital release.

== EPs ==
=== Studio recordings ===
Years	Album	Label	Notes
1988	1988 Summer Olympics Album - One Moment in Time "One moment in time" – "Olympic spirit" – "Shape of things to come" – "Indestructible" – "Reason to cry"	Arista Records ASCD-9745	Promo CD sampler; "Olympic Spirit": composed and conducted by John Williams.
1996	John Williams Conducting The Boston Pops "Candide (Overture)" – "America the beautiful" – "This land is your land" – "When the Saints go marchin' in"	Polygram 64885-2	DiskArt
2013	Oboe Concerto "I. Prelude"– "II. Pastorale"– "III. Commedia"	iTunes Release	Keisuke Wakao, Oboe; Boston Pops Orchestra; composed and conducted by John Williams.

=== Soundtracks / Motion Picture Scores composed and conducted by John Williams ===
Years	Album	Label	Notes
1989	Born on the Fourth of July "A Hard Rain's A Gonna Fall (by Edie Brickell & New Bohemians)" – "The Early Days, Maassapequa, 1957" - "A Hard Rain's A Gonna Fall (by Edie Brickell & New Bohemians)"	MCA Records (UK) MCAT 1397	Promo; composed and conducted by John Williams: "The Early Days, Maassapequa 1957"; reissued in 1989 on a CD single
2001	Harry Potter and the Sorcerer's Stone "Harry's Wondrous World" – "Platform Nine-And-Three-Quarters" – "And The Journey to Hogwarts" – "Hogwarts Forever! And The Moving Stairs" – "Hedwig's Theme"	Warner Music Poland	Promo; composed and conducted by John Williams.
2002	Star Wars: Episode II – Attack of the Clones "Across the Stars" (Love Theme from Attack of the Clones with Movie Dialog and Effects) – "Across the Stars" (Love Theme)/Across the Stars (Instrumental Edit)"	Sony Classical SSK 55977	Promo single; composed and conducted by John Williams.
2005	Star Wars: Episode III – Revenge of the Sith; Wal-Mart Limited Digital Download interview with composer John Williams	Sony Classical SK 94574	Composed and conducted by John Williams.

=== Live recordings ===
Years	Album	Label	Notes
2006	Memoirs of a Geisha - Live Sessions "Sayuri's Theme" – "A Dream Discarded" – "Going to School" – Interview with John Williams & Yo-Yo Ma.	Sony Classical	iTunes release; Yo-Yo Ma, cello; John Williams, piano; composed and conducted by John Williams.

=== EPs by Other Artists (Studio recordings) ===
Years	Album	Label	Notes
1959	Dreamsville "Two Sleepy People" – "Dreamsville" – "Soft Sounds" – "Slow And Easy"	Columbia B13271	Lola Albright feat. John Williams (Piano) on tracks Dreamsville, Soft Sounds & Slow And Easy
1960	The Mancini Touch "Like Young" – "Robbin's Nest" – "A Cool Shade Of Blue" – "Let's Walk"	RCA Victor EPA-4351	Henry Mancini feat. Johnny Williams (Piano)
1962	Songs for Christmas Vol. 1 "Silent Night, Holy Night" – "O Little Town Of Bethlehem" – "O Come, All Ye Faithful (Adeste Fidelis)" – "Sweet Little Jesus Boy"	CBS (Netherlands) EP 5.513	Mahalia Jackson with orchestra and chorus directed by Johnny Williams.
1962	Songs for Christmas Vol. 2 "White Christmas" – "No Room in the Inn" – "Joy to the World" – "Go Tell It on the Mountain"	CBS (Netherlands) EP 5.514	Mahalia Jackson with orchestra and chorus directed by Johnny Williams.
1962	Song of the Open Road "Song of the Open Road" – "The Girl in the Wood" – "The Wayfaring Stranger" – "North to Alaska"	CBS (UK) AGG 20036	Frankie Laine with orchestra and chorus directed by Johnny Williams.
1963	Hell Bent for Leather! "High Noon (Do Not Forsake Me)" – "Bowie Knife" – "Mule Train" – "Cool Water"	CBS (Netherlands) EP 5.526	Frankie Laine with orchestra and chorus directed by Johnny Williams.
1963	Great Songs of Love and Faith "The Green Leaves of Summer" – "Trees" – "Because" – "Danny Boy"	CBS (Netherlands) EP 5.522	Mahalia Jackson with orchestra and chorus directed by Johnny Williams.
1963	Hell Bent for Leather! "High Noon" – "Gunfight at O.K. Corral" – "Bowie Knife" – "The 3.10 to Yuma"	CBS (Australia) BG-225001	Frankie Laine with orchestra and chorus directed by Johnny Williams.

=== EPs by Other Artists (Soundtracks / Motion Picture Scores) ===
Years	Film/TV & Tracks	Label	Notes
1958	The Big Country "The Big Country" – "The Welcoming" – "The Old House" – "The Death Of Buck Hannery"	United Artists (UK) UEP 1014	Composed and conducted by Jerome Moross feat. John Williams (Piano)

== Singles ==
=== Studio recordings ===
Years	Tracks	Label	Notes
1962	Johnny Williams and His Orchestra "Montreal" – "Tuesday's Theme"	Columbia 4-42516	Side A - composed by P. Knauer, arranged and conducted by Johnny Williams; Side B - composed and conducted by Johnny Williams
1963	Johnny Williams and His Orchestra "The Black Knight" – "Augie's Great Piano"	Columbia 4-42777	Composed and conducted by Johnny Williams, piano.
1963	Johnny Williams and His Orchestra (Something Cool For The Summer!) "The Black Knight" – "The Black Knight"	Columbia 4-42777	Promo; composed and conducted by Johnny Williams.
1996	Summon the Heroes "Summon the Heroes (Radio Edit)" – "Summon the Heroes (Album Version)"	Sony Classical SSK 6362	Promo; composed and conducted by John Williams.
1996	Summon the Heroes "Summon the Heroes (Radio Edit 1)" – "Summon the Heroes (Radio Edit 2)"	Sony Classical SAMPCD 01	Promo; composed and conducted by John Williams.
2002	Call of the Champions "Call of the Champions (Radio Edit)" – "The Mission Theme"	Sony Classical SSK 55975	Promo; composed and conducted by John Williams.

=== Soundtracks / Motion Picture Scores composed and conducted by John Williams ===
Years	Film/TV & Tracks	Label	Notes
1960	Checkmate "Theme from Checkmate"	Columbia 3-41925	Plays at 33 RPM; composed and conducted by John Williams.
1960	Checkmate "Theme from Checkmate" – "The Black Knight"	Columbia 4-41925	Composed and conducted by Johnny Williams.
1963	Diamond Head "Pin A Medal On Joey" – "Diamond Head"	Colpix Music CP 672	James Darren; side B - composed by H. Winterhalter & M. David, arranged and conducted by Johnny Williams
1966	Penelope "Penelope" – "Penelope"	MGM Records; MGM K13625	The Pennypipers; Promo; Composed, produced & conducted by Johnny Williams
1967	Valley of the Dolls "Theme from Valley of the Dolls" – "Jennifer's French Movie"	20th Century Fox Records (Germany) CF 104	Composed and conducted by Johnny Williams.
1967	Valley of the Dolls "Come Live with Me (from the 20th Century Fox Film 'Valley of the dolls')" – "The Glory of Love (and Theme from 'Guess Who's Coming To Dinner')	RCA 47-9399	Vic Damone; "Come Live with Me" arranged and conducted by John T. Williams
1967	Fitzwilly "Fitzwilly's Date" – "Make Me Rainbows"	United Artists UA 50244	Promo; Johnny Williams, his orchestra and chorus; composed and conducted by Johnny Williams.
1972	Banda Sonora Original Do Filme "Um Violino No Telhado" "If I Were A Rich Man" – "Miracle Of Miracles"	United Artists Records (Portugal) N.S-14-50	Adapted and conducted by John Williams.
1974	Earthquake "Main Title, Earthquake" – "Love Theme from Earthquake"	MCA Records MCA-40332	Composed and conducted by John Williams.
1975	Jaws "Main Title (Theme from Jaws)" – "End Title (Theme from Jaws)"	MCA Records MCA-40439	Composed and conducted by John Williams.
1975	The Eiger Sanction "Theme from The Eiger Sanction" – "Theme from The Eiger Sanction"	MCA Records MCA-40424	Promo; composed and conducted by John Williams.
1976	Midway "Midway March" – "The Men of the Yorktown March"	MCA Records MCA-40575	Composed and conducted by John Williams.
1977	Close Encounters of the Third Kind "Theme from Close Encounters of the Third Kind"	Arista AS9500	Single sided, promo, 33 ⅓ RPM; composed and conducted by John Williams.
1977	Close Encounters of the Third Kind "Theme from Close Encounters of the Third Kind" (Stereo) – "Theme from Close Encounters of the Third Kind" (Mono)	Arista AS 0300	Promo; composed and conducted by John Williams.
1977	Close Encounters of the Third Kind "Theme from Close Encounters of the Third Kind"– "Nocturnal Pursuit'	Arista AS 0300	Composed and conducted by John Williams.
1977	Star Wars "Cantina Band" – "Star Wars (Main Title) (Edit)"	20th Century Records TC-2345	Composed and conducted by John Williams.
1978	Superman "Theme from Superman (Main Title) (Edit)" – "Theme from Superman (Main Title) (Edit)"	Warner Bros. Records WBS 8729	Promo; composed and conducted by John Williams.
1978	Superman "Theme from Superman (Main Title) (Edit)" – "Love Theme from Superman"	Warner Bros. Records WBS 8729	Composed and conducted by John Williams.
1980	Star Wars- The Empire Strikes Back "Star Wars (Main Theme)" – "The Imperial March"	RSO (Spain) 20 90 490	Composed and conducted by John Williams.
1981	Raiders of the Lost Ark "The Raiders March (La Marche des Aventuriers)" – "Raiders of the Lost Ark (Les Aventuriers de l'Arche Perdue)"	CBS Records (France) CBS A 1745	Composed and conducted by John Williams.
1982	E.T. the Extra-Terrestrial "Theme from E.T. (The Extra Terrestrial)" – "Over the Moon"	MCA Records MCA-52072	Composed and conducted by John Williams.
1982	Yes, Giorgio "If We Were in Love (by Luciano Pavarotti) (Edit)" – "If We Were in Love (Instrumental)"	London LON 45 20103	Lyrics: Alan and Marilyn Bergman; composed and conducted by John Williams.
1983	Star Wars – Return of the Jedi "Lapti Nek (Jabba's Palace Band)" – "Ewok Celebration"	RSO PRO 208 DJ	Promo; Netherlands variant with "Lapti Nek (Jabba's Palace Band) (Club Mix)" on the B side; lyrics: Annie M. Arbogast; composed and conducted by John Williams.
1983	Star Wars – Return of the Jedi "Lapti Nek (Jabba's Palace Band) (Club Mix)" – "Lapti Nek (Jabba's Palace Band) (Dub Mix)"	RSO 813 774-1	12" promo; lyrics: Annie M. Arbogast; composed and conducted by John Williams.
1989	Born on the Fourth of July "Born on the Fourth of July (Remix)" – "Born on the Fourth of July (Remix)"	MCA Records CD45-18122	Promo; composed and conducted by John Williams.
1989	Born on the Fourth of July "A Hard Rain's A Gonna Fall (by Edie Brickell & New Bohemians)" – "The Early Days, Maassapequa, 1957"	MCA Records (UK) MCA 1397	Composed and conducted by John Williams: "The Early Days, Maassapequa, 1957".
1989	Indiana Jones and the Last Crusade "Raiders March (Edit)" – "Scherzo for Motorcycle and Orchestra (Edit)"	Warner Bros. Records 7-22931	Composed and conducted by John Williams.
1991	Hook "Prologue"	Epic (Spain) ARIE 3104	Composed and conducted by John Williams.
1993	Jurassic Park "Theme from Jurassic Park"	MCA Records MCA5P-2738	CD single; composed and conducted by John Williams.
1993	Jurassic Park "Theme from Jurassic Park" - "End Credits"	MCA Records MCD 30797	CD single; composed and conducted by John Williams.
1993	Schindler's List "Theme from Schindler's List" - "Theme from Schindler's List (reprise)".	MCA Records MCA5P-3042	CD single; composed and conducted by John Williams.
1995	Sabrina "Moonlight"	A&M Records AMCDP 00128	"Moonlight" lyrics: Alan & Marilyn Bergman; composed and conducted by John Williams.
1997	Amistad "Dry your Tears, Afrika"	DreamWorks PRO-CD-5049	Composed and conducted by John Williams.
1997	Star Wars – A New Hope "Main Title/Blockade Runner" – "Imperial Attack"	BMG 74321-455952	Composed and conducted by John Williams.
1997	Star Wars – A New Hope: Figrin d'An & the Modal Nodes "Cantina Band" – "Cantina Band n° 2"	BMG 09026-68973-2	Composed and conducted by John Williams.
1997	Star Wars – Return of the Jedi: The Max Rebo Band "Jedi Rocks"	BMG 09026-68974-2	Composed and arranged by Jerry Hey; conducted by John Williams.
1997	Star Wars Trilogy "The Imperial March (Darth Vader's Theme)"	BMG 09026-68821-2	UK variant with the additional track "Betrayal At Bespin"; composed and conducted by John Williams.
1999	Star Wars: Episode I – The Phantom Menace "Duel of the Fates" (Dialogue and Sound Effects Mix)	Sony Classical SSK 5776	Promo; Composed and conducted by John Williams; released in 1999 with no dialogue and no sound effects mix; Sony Classical.
1999	Star Wars: Episode I – The Phantom Menace "Duel of the Fates"	Sony Classical	Promo; Composed and conducted by John Williams
2001	Harry Potter and the Sorcerer's Stone "Hedwig's Theme (Radio Edit)"	Warner Sunset/ Nonesuch/Atlantic	Composed and conducted by John Williams
2005	Star Wars: Episode III – Revenge of the Sith "Battle of the Heroes/Battle of the Heroes (Dialogue and Sound Effects Mix)"	Sony Classical SSK 55441	Promo; Radio single; composed and conducted by John Williams.
2005	Star Wars: Episode III – Revenge of the Sith; Target Special Offer – "Battle of the Heroes (with Dialogue)" download	Sony Classical 6759562	Composed and conducted by John Williams.
2016	Star Wars: The Force Awakens "March of the Resistance/Rey's Theme""	Walt Disney Records D002367111	10" picture disc
2016	Star Wars: The Force Awakens "March of the Resistance/Rey's Theme"	Walt Disney Records D002353711 ST01	10" BB-8 picture disc
2017	Star Wars - A New Hope "Main Title" – "The Throne Room and End Title"	Walt Disney Records D002549111	Composed and conducted by John Williams.10"disc vinyl
2019	Star Wars - A New Hope (Commemorative Edition Skywalker Saga) "Main Title" – "Cantina Band"	Walt Disney Records D003217621	Composed and conducted by John Williams.7"disc vinyl
2019	Star Wars - The Empire Strikes Back (Commemorative Edition Skywalker Saga) "The Imperial March (Darth Vaders`s Theme)" – "The Asteroid Field"	Walt Disney Records D003245921	Composed and conducted by John Williams.7"disc vinyl
2021	Indiana Jones and Raiders Of The Lost Ark (40th Anniversary) "The Raiders March" – "The Raiders March"	Walt Disney Records D003813111	Composed and conducted by John Williams.10" picture disc vinyl
2022	Star Wars - Obi-Wan Kenobi Theme	Walt Disney Records	Digital Single; Composed and conducted by John Williams.

=== Live recordings ===
Years	Tracks	Label	Notes
2013	"For 'The President's Own'"	Marjer Music	Digital Single; Composed and conducted by John Williams; recorded on July 3, 2013 with "The President's Own"
2022	The Berlin Concert "Superman March" – "Harry's Wondrous World (From Harry Potter And The Philosopher's Stone)"	Deutsche Grammophon	Composed and conducted by John Williams; (7" Vinyl, Limited Edition, Numbered, Stereo, Gold)

=== Singles by Other Artists (Studio recordings) ===
Years	Tracks	Label	Notes
1957	"Recipe For Love" – "I'm Too Young"	MGM	Sheb Wooley; John Towner Williams, piano.
1957	"I Found Me An Angel" – "So Close To Heaven"	MGM	Sheb Wooley; B-side: John Towner Williams, piano.
1958	"The Purple People Eater" – "I Can't Believe You're Mine"	MGM	Sheb Wooley; John Towner Williams, piano.
1958	"The Bull Fighter (Ray Vasquez)" – "Where Do You Work A-John (Tommy Sandi)"	Beau Monde	Ray Vasquez & Tommy Sandi Featuring the John T. Williams Orchestra.
1958	"My Johnny" – "Pigmy Love"	Beau Monde	The Pixies (Judy & Jean) featuring the John T. Williams Orchestra.
1959	"Fallout!" – "Dreamsville"	RCA Victor	Henry Mancini and his Orchestra; Johnny Williams (piano); No. 47-7442; Recorded August & September, 1958; Released January, 1959
1959	"I Ain't Sharin' Sharon" – "Love Among The Young"	Colpix Music	James Darren; side B - composed by J. Styne & S. Styne, arranged and conducted by Johnny Williams
1959	"Teenage Tears" – "Let There Be Love"	Colpix Music	James Darren; side B - composed by I. Grant & L. Rand, arranged and conducted by Johnny Williams
1960	"Here She Comes Now" – "Kisses That Shake the World"	Columbia	Frankie Laine; side A - with orchestra conducted by Johnny Williams.
1960	"Poor Little Girl" – "Stranger"	Columbia	Mike Clifford with Johnny Williams and his orchestra.
1961	"Gunslinger" – "Wanted Man"	Columbia	Frankie Laine with Johnny Williams and his orchestra; No. 4-41974
1961	"Adrift on a Star" – "The Pleasure of Her Company"	Columbia	Vic Damone with Johnny Williams and his orchestra.
1961	"Theme from 'By Love Possessed'" – "If It Is The Last Thing That I Do"	Columbia	Vic Damone with Johnny Williams and his orchestra.
1961	"The Long and the Short and the Tall (Bless em' All)" – "Hi-Jig-A-Jig"	Columbia	Laurence Harvey with the Long & the Short & the Tall Chorus with Johnny Williams & his orchestra.
1962	"Joanna" – "Mary, Mary"	Columbia	Mike Clifford with Johnny Williams and his orchestra on track "Joanna" (from the TV Production "PETER GUNN")
1962	"A Wedded Man" – "We'll Be Together Again"	Columbia	Frankie Laine with Johnny Williams and his orchestra.
1962	"Joy to the World" – "Go Tell It on the Mountain"	Columbia	Mahalia Jackson with Johnny Williams and his Orchestra.
1962	"O Little Town of Bethlehem" – "What Can I Give"	Columbia	Mahalia Jackson with orchestra and chorus conducted by Johnny Williams.
1963	"Rawhide" – "The Hanging Tree"	CBS (Netherlands)	Frankie Laine with orchestra and chorus directed by Johnny Williams.
1963	"Don't Make My Baby Blue" – "The Moment of Truth"	Columbia	Frankie Laine with orchestra and chorus directed by Johnny Williams.
1963	"Silent Night, Holy Night" – "O Come, All Ye Faithful (Adeste Fidelis)"	CBS	Mahalia Jackson with orchestra and chorus conducted by Johnny Williams; reissued in 1967.
1963	"Fascination" – "The Last Time I Saw Paris"	Columbia 3-8834	André Previn; Orchestra arranged & conducted by Johnny Williams
1966	"Gunfight at O.K. Corral" – "Blowing Wild"	CBS (Netherlands)	Frankie Laine with orchestra and chorus directed by Johnny Williams.
1974	"That's What Friends Are For" – "Dream Away"	A&M Records	"Dream Away" Composed by Paul Williams & J. Williams; Arranged and Conducted by John Williams.

=== Singles by Other Artists (Soundtracks / Motion Picture Scores) ===
Years	Film/TV & Tracks	Label	Notes
1959	Johnny Staccato "Staccato's Theme" – "The Jazz At Waldo's"	Capitol Records	Composed and conducted by Elmer Bernstein; Johnny Williams, piano.

== Compilation albums ==
Year	Album	Label	Notes
1987	Boston Pops: By Request – The Best of John Williams and the Boston Pops	Philips	Includes previously unreleased material; composed and conducted by John Williams; Reissued for digital download in 2014, Universal
1990	Boston Pops: Star Wars - The Best of Space Music	Philips	Composed and conducted by John Williams; reissued for digital download in 2014, Decca.
1991	The Very Best of the Boston Pops	Philips	Reissued for digital download in 2014, Decca.
1992	Boston Pops: Kids Stuff – An Afternoon at the Movies	PolyGram	
1992	Boston Pops: Movies	Philips	
1992	Boston Pops: Over the Rainbow	Philips	Reissued for digital download in 2006, Universal
1993	Film Works	MCA Records/Japan	Composed and conducted by John Williams; reissued, sometimes partially, in 1995, 1997 & 2001.
1995	Boston Pops: Pops Stoppers	Philips	Reissued for digital download in 2014, Universal
1995	Boston Pops: Space-Taculars	Philips	Club edition; reissued for digital download in 2014, Decca.
1995	Boston Pops: Space and Time	Polygram/Karussell	
1996	Boston Pops: Salute Gene Kelly, Fred Astair, Judy Garland	PolyGram	
1996	Boston Pops: Salute to America	Polygram	
1998	Boston Pops: From Sousa to Spielberg	Sony Music Distribution	
1998	The Very Best of John Williams and the Boston Pops	Reader's Digest	4-CD set
1999	Boston Pops: John Williams Conducts Music from the Star Wars Saga	Philips	Composed and conducted by John Williams.
1999	John Williams Greatest Hits 1969–1999	Sony Classical	Some tracks by the London Symphony Orchestra; composed and conducted by John Williams; reissued for digital download in 2014, Sony Classical.
2001	Boston Pops: American Classics	Philips Classical	Reissued for digital download in 2009, Universal
2001	John Williams and the Boston Pops Orchestra: A Collection	Sony/Japan	
2004	Boston Pops: Encore!	Philips	2-CD set; reissued in 2012 "A Celebration", Decca; Reissued for digital download in 2014, Universal
2006	20th Century Masters – The Millennium Collection: The Best of John Williams & The Boston Pops	Hip-O	Composed and conducted by John Williams.
2006	John T. Williams - Jazz Beginnings	Fresh Sounds Records	John T. Williams, piano; Reissued for digital download in 2013, Jazz City Series
2006	Checkmate/Rhythm in Motion	Film Score Monthly	Checkmate's music composed and conducted by Johnny Williams; Rhythm in Motion's music conducted by Johnny Williams.
2007	Star Wars – The Corellian Edition	Sony Classical	Composed and conducted by John Williams.
2007	The Music of Star Wars: 30th Anniversary Collection	Sony Classical	7-CD set; composed and conducted by John Williams.
2010	The Music of America: John Williams	Sony Masterworks	3-CD set, some tracks by The London Symphony Orchestra.
2012	A Tribute to John Williams: An 80th Birthday Celebration	Sony Classical	Includes previously unreleased material; composed and conducted by John Williams; Reissued for digital download in 2012, Sony Classical
2015	John Williams: The Great Movie Soundtracks	Sony Classical	4-CD set, previously released in Europe in 2013.
2015	John Williams - The Best Selection / Boston Pops	Decca/Japan	
2015	John Williams Conducts Music From Star Wars / Boston Pops	Decca	2-CD set; Reissued for digital download in 2013, Decca
2016	Star Wars: The Ultimate Vinyl Collection	Sony Classical	11-vinyl box set, audio of Star Wars, Empire Strikes Back and Return of the Jedi was transferred from the original LP masters using the highest resolution; composed and conducted by John Williams; also issued for digital download in 2016, Star Wars: The Ultimate Digital Collection, Sony Classical.
2016	Star Wars: The Ultimate Soundtrack Edition	Sony Classical	10 CDs + 1 DVD; audio of Star Wars, Empire Strikes Back and Return of the Jedi is from the 1997 Expanded Editions; composed and conducted by John Williams.
2017	John Williams/Steven Spielberg: The Ultimate Collection	Sony Masterworks	3 CDs + 1 DVD; The third disc includes previously unreleased material; composed and conducted by John Williams; reissued in 2017 as 6-LP, Music On Vinyl; Reissued partially as 2-LP in 2017, John Williams/Steven Spielberg: The Ultimate Collection Highlights, Sony Classical.
2017	Lost in Space: The Complete John Williams Collection	Spacelab9	4 LPs
2018	John Williams Conductor	Sony Classical	20-CD box set that features all of his definitive recordings for Sony Classical.
2022	John Williams and the Boston Pops Orchestra (Complete Philips Recordings)	Decca	21-CD box set that features all of his definitive recordings for Philips.
2023	The Legend of John Williams: Original Soundtracks, Concert Works And Songs, 1960-2022	Universal Music France	20-CD box set.

== Expanded reissue soundtrack albums ==
This section features expanded reissue albums of already released scores.

Year	Album	Label	Notes
1993	Star Wars Trilogy: The Original Soundtrack Anthology	Twentieth Century Fox Film Scores	Includes previously unreleased material; composed and conducted by John Williams.
1995	Heidi [Original Motion Picture Score] (1968)	X Label, Europe	Includes previously unreleased material; composed and conducted by John Williams.
1995	Raiders of the Lost Ark [Original Motion Picture Soundtrack] (1981)	DCC Compact Classics	Includes previously unreleased material; composed and conducted by John Williams.
1995	The Reivers [Original Score] (1969)	Legacy/Columbia	Includes previously unreleased material; composed and conducted by John Williams.
1997	The Star Wars Trilogy Special Edition: A New Hope [Original Motion Picture Soundtrack]	BMG Classics/RCA Victor	Includes previously unreleased material; composed and conducted by John Williams; reissued in 2004, Sony Classical; reissued for digital download in 2014, Sony Classical.
1997	The Star Wars Trilogy Special Edition: Return of the Jedi [Original Motion Picture Soundtrack]	BMG Classics/RCA Victor	Includes previously unreleased material; Composed and Conducted by John Williams; reissued in 2004, Sony Classical; reissued for digital download in 2014, Sony Classical.
1997	The Star Wars Trilogy Special Edition: The Empire Strikes Back [Original Motion Picture Soundtrack]	BMG Classics/RCA Victor	Includes previously unreleased material; composed and conducted by John Williams; reissued in 2004, Sony Classical; reissued for digital download in 2014, Sony Classical.
1998	Close Encounters of the Third Kind [The Collector's Edition Soundtrack]	Arista	Includes previously unreleased material; composed and conducted by John Williams; Reissued for digital download in 2015, Arista
1999	The Missouri Breaks [Original Motion Picture Soundtrack] (1976)	Rykodisc	Includes previously unreleased material, composed and conducted by John Williams; reissued in 2004, Varèse Sarabande.
2000	Star Wars: Episode I – The Phantom Menace [Original Motion Picture Soundtrack] [The Ultimate Edition] (1999)	Sony Classical	2-CD Album, includes previously unreleased material; composed and conducted by John Williams.
2000	Superman: The Movie [Original Motion Picture Soundtrack] (1978)	Warner Archives/Rhino	Includes previously unreleased material; composed and conducted by John Williams; Reissued for digital download in 2005, Rhino/Warner Bros.
2001	Fiddler on the Roof [Original Motion Picture Soundtrack Recording] (1971)	EMI Capitol	30th anniversary, includes previously unreleased material; music for stage play and film by Jerry Bock; music adapted and conducted by John Williams.
2001	The Towering Inferno [Original Motion Picture Soundtrack] (1974)	Film Score Monthly	Includes previously unreleased material; composed and conducted by John Williams.
2002	E.T.: The Extra-Terrestrial [Original Motion Picture Soundtrack] [The 20th Anniversary] (1982)	MCA Records	Includes previously unreleased material; also issued as a SACD; composed and conducted by John Williams; Reissued for digital download in 2017, Geffen Records
2002	Home Alone 2 – Lost in New York [Original Score] (1992)	Varèse Sarabande CD Club	Deluxe edition 2-CD set, includes previously unreleased material; composed and conducted by John Williams.
2004	Tom Sawyer [Original Motion Picture Soundtrack] (1973)	Varèse Sarabande	Includes previously unreleased material; music and lyrics by Richard M. & Robert B. Sherman; music adapted and conducted by John Williams.
2006	Goodbye, Mr. Chips [Original Motion Picture Soundtrack] (1969)	Film Score Monthly	3-CD set, includes previously unreleased material; music and lyrics by Leslie Bricusse; music supervised and Conducted by John Williams.
2008	Indiana Jones: The Soundtracks Collection	Concord Records	5-CD set, includes previously unreleased material; composed and conducted by John Williams.
2008	Raiders of the Lost Ark [Original Motion Picture Soundtrack] (1981)	Concord Records	Includes previously unreleased material on CD; composed and conducted by John Williams; Reissued for digital download in 2017, Concord Music Group; Reissued in 2017 as 2-LP, Concord Records.
2008	Indiana Jones and the Temple of Doom [Original Motion Picture Soundtrack] (1984)	Concord Records	Includes previously unreleased material; composed and conducted by John Williams.
2008	Indiana Jones And The Last Crusade [Original Motion Picture Soundtrack] (1989)	Concord Records	Includes previously unreleased material; composed and conducted by John Williams; Reissued for digital download in 2009, Concord Music Group
2010	The Poseidon Adventure [Original Motion Picture Score] (1972)	La-La Land Records	Includes previously unreleased material; composed and conducted by John Williams.
2010	Home Alone [Expanded Original Motion Picture Score] (1990)	La-La Land Records	Includes previously unreleased material; composed and conducted by John Williams.
2011	1941 [Original Motion Picture Score] (1979)	La-La Land Records	Includes previously unreleased material; composed and conducted by John Williams; reissued in 2015, La-La Land Records.
2012	Hook [Expanded Original Motion Picture Soundtrack] (1991)	La-La Land Records	2-CD set, includes previously unreleased material; composed and conducted by John Williams.
2012	Home Alone 2 [Expanded Original Motion Picture Score] (1992)	La-La Land Records	2-CD set, includes previously unreleased material; composed and conducted by John Williams.
2012	The Long Goodbye [Original Motion Picture Soundtrack] (1973)	Quartet Records/Spain	Includes previously unreleased material; composed and conducted by John Williams; reissued in 2015, Quartet Records.
2013	Jurassic Park: 20th Anniversary [Original Motion Picture Soundtrack] (1993)	Geffen Records	Includes previously unreleased material; composed by John Williams; co-conducted by John Williams and Artie Kane (uncredited); digital release; Reissued for digital download in 2014, Geffen Records
2013	The Fury [Expanded Original Motion Picture Score] (1978)	La-La Land Records	2-CD set, featuring the original score including previously unreleased material, along with the remastered original album recorded by The London Symphony Orchestra; composed and conducted by John Williams.
2013	Heidi [Music From The Original Soundtrack Of The NBC Television Special] (1968)	Quartet Records/Spain	Includes previously unreleased material; composed and conducted by John Williams.
2013	Rosewood [Music From The Motion Picture] (1997)	La-La Land Records	2-CD set, includes previously unreleased material; composed and conducted by John Williams.
2014	Empire of the Sun [Original Motion Picture Soundtrack] (1987)	La-La Land Records	2-CD set, includes previously unreleased material; composed and conducted by John Williams; choir conductor: Janine Wagner.
2015	A.I. Artificial Intelligence [Expanded Archival Collection] (2001)	La-La Land Records	3-CD set, includes previously unreleased material; composed and conducted by John Williams.
2015	Jaws 2 [Original Motion Picture Soundtrack] (1978)	Intrada	2-CD set, includes previously unreleased material; composed and conducted by John Williams.
2015	Jaws [Original Motion Picture Soundtrack] (1975)	Intrada	2-CD set, includes previously unreleased material; composed and conducted by John Williams; reissued partially in 2017 as 2-LP, available in "Ocean Blue" Vinyl and "Gram Black" Vinyl, Mondo Records.
2015	Home Alone 25th Anniversary: Limited Edition (1990)	La-La Land Records	2-CD set, includes previously unreleased material; composed and conducted by John Williams.
2015	Tom Sawyer [Expanded Original MGM Motion Picture Soundtrack] (1973)	Quartet Records/Spain	2-CD set, includes previously unreleased material; music and lyrics by Richard M. & Robert B. Sherman; music adapted and conducted by John Williams.
2016	The John Williams Jurassic Park Collection: Limited Edition [Expanded Original Motion Picture Scores]	La-La Land Records	4-CD set, includes previously unreleased material; composed by John Williams; co-conducted by John Williams and Artie Kane.
2017	E.T.: The Extra-Terrestrial - 35th Anniversary Remastered Edition (1982)	La-La Land Records	2-CD set, includes previously unreleased material; composed and conducted by John Williams; reissued in 2022 as 40th Anniversary Edition, La-La Land Records; reissued partially in 2018 as 2-LP "E.T. The Extra-Terrestrial: Limited Edition Vinyl", La-La Land Records and in 2022 as 2-LP by Mondo Music
2017	Close Encounters of the Third Kind - 40th Anniversary Remastered Edition (1977)	La-La Land Records	2-CD set, includes previously unreleased material; composed and conducted by John Williams; reissued in 2022 as 45th Anniversary Edition, La-La Land Records;
2018	The Cowboys: The Deluxe Edition [Original Motion Picture Soundtrack] (1972)	Varèse Sarabande	Includes previously unreleased material; composed and conducted by John Williams; Reissued in 2022 as 2-LP Gold Vinyl, Varèse Sarabande.
2018	Saving Private Ryan: 20th Anniversary Limited Edition (1998)	La-La Land Records	Includes previously unreleased material; composed and conducted by John Williams.
2018	Dracula: The Deluxe Edition [Original Motion Picture Soundtrack] (1979)	Varèse Sarabande	2-CD set, includes previously unreleased material; Composed and conducted by John Williams.
2018	Harry Potter - The John Williams Soundtrack Collection: Limited Edition	La-La Land Records	7-CD set, Includes previously unreleased material; composed and conducted by John Williams, except The Chamber of secrets music by John Williams, adapted and conducted by William Ross.
2018	Schindler's List: 25th Anniversary Limited Edition (1993)	La-La Land Records	2-CD set, Includes previously unreleased material; composed and conducted by John Williams.
2019	Superman: The Movie - 40th Anniversary Remastered Limited Edition (1978)	La-La Land Records	3-CD set, Composed and conducted by John Williams.
2019	Monsignor [Expanded Original Motion Picture Soundtrack] (1982)	Intrada	Includes previously unreleased material; Composed and conducted by John Williams.
2019	Minority Report [Expanded Original Motion Picture Soundtrack] (2002)	La-La Land Records	2-CD set, Includes previously unreleased material; composed and conducted by John Williams.
2020	Far and Away [Expanded Original Motion Picture Soundtrack] (1992)	La-La Land Records	2-CD set, Includes previously unreleased material; composed and conducted by John Williams.
2020	War of the Worlds [Expanded Original Motion Picture Soundtrack] (2005)	Intrada	2-CD set, Includes previously unreleased material; composed and conducted by John Williams.
2021	Always [Expanded Original Motion Picture Soundtrack] (1990)	La-La Land Records (LLLCD 1527)	Includes previously unreleased material; composed and conducted by John Williams.
2021	Fiddler on the Roof [Original Motion Picture Soundtrack Recording+Original Score Adaptation] (1971)	La-La Land Records	50th anniversary, includes playbacks and additional score; music for stage play and film by Jerry Bock; music adapted and conducted by John Williams.
2022	SpaceCamp [Expanded Original Motion Picture Soundtrack] (1986)	Intrada	Includes previously unreleased material; composed and conducted by John Williams.
2022	Presumed Innocent: The Deluxe Edition [Complete Score] (1990)	Varèse Sarabande	Includes previously unreleased material; composed and conducted by John Williams.
2022	Jurassic Park [Remastered and Expanded Original Soundtrack] (1993)	La-La Land Records	Includes previously unreleased material; composed and conducted by John Williams.
2022	Amistad [Remastered and Expanded Original Motion Picture Score] (1997)	La-La Land Records	25th anniversary, Includes cues, source music, concert arrangements, and alternates not used in the film; composed and conducted by John Williams.
2023	Sabrina [Remastered and Expanded Original Soundtrack] (1995)	La-La Land Records	Includes previously unreleased material; composed and conducted by John Williams.
2023	The Lost World [Remastered and Expanded Original Soundtrack] (1997)	La-La Land Records	Includes previously unreleased material; composed and conducted by John Williams.
2023	Hook [Remastered and Expanded Original Soundtrack] (1991)	La-La Land Records	Includes previously unreleased material; composed and conducted by John Williams.
2023	Heidi / Jane Eyre [Remastered and Expanded Original Soundtrack] (1968-1970)	Quartet Records	Includes previously unreleased material; composed and conducted by John Williams.

== Collaborations and Featurings ==
=== Studio albums (Collaborations & Featurings) ===
Year	Album	Other artist(s)	Notes
1954	Stan Getz at the Shrine	Stan Getz	Featuring Stan Getz (tenor saxophone), John T. Williams (piano), Bill Anthony (bass), Bob Brookmeyer (valve trombone), Art Mardigan, Frank Isola (drums).
1956	Calypso	Harry Belafonte	Featuring John T. Williams (piano) (uncredited); RCA Victor; reissued in 1992, RCA; reissued in the 2014 compilation Calypso/Belafonte Sings The Caribbean, Jackpot Records.
1956	The Johnny Ever Green's Played by Russell Garcia	Russ Garcia	Featuring John T. Williams (piano); Paramount Records; reissued for digital download in 2012, Smith & Co.
1957	Listen To The Music Of Russell Garcia	Russ Garcia	Featuring John T. Williams (piano); reissued in the 2005 compilation Los Angeles River, Fresh Sound Records.
1957	Fielding's Formula	Jerry Fielding	Featuring John T. Williams (piano); Decca; reissued for digital download in 2009, Mastercorp Pty Ltd.
1957	Remembering with Marjorie Lee	Marjorie Lee	Arrangements by John T. Williams (piano); BeauMonde; reissued in 1989, Fresh Sound Records.
1957	Yvonne De Carlo Sings	Yvonne De Carlo	Orchestra conducted by John Williams; Masterseal Records; reissued in 2010, Screenland Records; reissued for digital download in 2011, Smith & Co.
1957	Connie Haines sings a tribute to Helen Morgan	Connie Haines	Featuring John T. Williams (piano); Tops Records; Reissued in 1997 + Extra track, Simitar; Reissued in 2002, LPTime Records/Spain.
1957	Modern Jazz Gallery	Various Artists	Some tracks with John T. Williams Quartet; Kapp Records, 2 LP.
1958	Carmen For Cool Ones	Carmen McRae	Featuring John T. Williams (piano) on tracks " Any Old Time", "What's New?", "Without A Word Of warning", "The Night We Call It A Day"; Decca DL 8738; Recorded in Los Angeles, December 5, 16, 1957 and April 21, 1958; reissued in 2012, Fresh Sound Records
1958	Songs By A Moody Miss Georgia Carr: America's Foremost Night Club Singer	Georgia Carr	Featuring John T. Williams (piano); Tops Records L 1617; Recorded at Radio Recorders, Los Angeles, December 18–20, 1957; reissued in 2019, Fresh Sound Records
1958	Come Swing With Me	Tony Travis	Featuring Johnny Williams, piano & celeste; Verve Records MGV-2100; Recorded at Radio Recorders, Los Angeles, February, 5, 11 and 18, 1958; reissued in 2020, Fresh Sound Records
1958	Anita O'Day Sings The Winners	Anita O'Day	Featuring John Williams (piano) on tracks "Interlude (Night in Tunisia", "Four" and "Early autumn"; Verve Records; MGV-8283; Recorded April 2&3, 1958
1958	South Pacific	Walter Ruick	Featuring John T. Williams (piano); Tops Records.
1958	Frank Sinatra Sings For Only The Lonely	Frank Sinatra	Featuring John Williams (piano) on tracks "Blues In The Night", "What`s New?" & "Gone With The Wind"; Capitol Records; (S)-W1053; reissued in 2018 as 60th ANNIVERSARY EDITION, Capitol Records, B0028602-02
1958	Johnny Desmond Swings	Johnny Desmond	Featuring John Williams (piano); Tops Records; Reissued in 1997, Simitar Distribution; Reissued for digital download in 2006, TP4 Music.
1958	Hollywoodwind Jazztet	Jerry Fielding	Featuring John T. Williams (piano); Decca.
1958	Porgy & Bess	"Porgy & Bess" Broadway cast	Arranged and conducted by Johnny T. Williams, The Hollywood Grand Studio Orchestra; performed by Bill Reeves, Norma Zimmer, Bill Lee, Mami Nixon and Earl Wilki; Tops Records; Reissued in stereo on Golden Tone;
1958	Holiday in Spain	Lew Raymond	Featuring John T. Williams (piano): Malaguena, Gitanerias; Top Records.
1959	Voodoo Exotic Music From Polynesia And The Far East	Robert Drasnin	Featuring John Williams (piano); Tops Records; Reissued in 1960 as Percussion Exotique, Stereo, Tops Mayfair Records; Reissued on CD in 1996 as Voodoo, Dionysus Records.
1959	Folk Songs for Far Out Folk	Fred Katz	Featuring Johnny T. Williams (piano); Warner Bros.; reissued in 2007, Reebot Stereophonic Records.
1959	At the Cinema!	Buddy Collette	Featuring John Williams (piano); Mercury; reissued in 2010, Fresh Sounds Records.
1959	Album No. 1	James Darren	Some tracks arranged and conducted by Johnny Williams, Colpix Records.
1959	African jazz	Les Baxter	Featuring Johnny Williams (piano); Capitol; reissued in 2015, African Jazz + Jungle Jazz (2 LPs on 1 CD) + 5 bonus tracks, Fresh Sounds Records.
1959	Jungle jazz	Les Baxter	Featuring Johnny Williams (piano); Capitol; reissued in 2015 African Jazz + Jungle Jazz (2 LPs on 1 CD) + 5 bonus tracks, Fresh Sounds Records.
1959	Dreamsville	Lola Albright	Featuring John Williams (piano); Columbia; Released in August 1959, Columbia, Stereo; Reissued in 2008 & 2010, LPTime Records.
1959	Sound Spectacular	Ray Anthony	Featuring Johnny Williams (piano); Capitol; Released in 1959, Capitol, Stereo; Reissued in 1968 as "Brass Galore", Aero Space Records, Stereo.
1959	Take Me Along	Marty Paich	Featuring Johnny Williams (piano); RCA Victor; reissued for digital download in 2012, Hot Record Society.
1959	I Swing for You	Vicky Lane	Conducted by Pete Candoli; featuring Johnny Williams (piano); RCA Victor.
1959	Peter Gunn	Ted Nash	Featuring John T. Williams (piano); Crown.
1960	First Affair	The Four Freshmen	Featuring John Williams (harpsichord & celeste) on tracks "Long Ago (And Far Away)" and "I've Never Been In Love Before", Capitol, (S)T-1378; reissued in 2002 on Two On One (First Affair/Voices In Fun) (2002, EMI Records 541 6672)
1960	The Mancini Touch	Henry Mancini	Conducted by Henry Mancini; featuring Johnny Williams (piano); RCA Victor; reissued in 2010, Fresh Sound Records.
1960	10 Trombones Like 2 Pianos	Pete Rugolo	Featuring John T. Williams (piano); Mercury; reissued in the 2007 compilation Exploring New Sounds, Fresh Sound Records.
1960	The Big Small Bands	Dave Pell	Featuring Johnny Williams (piano) (organ); Capitol; reissued in the 2011 compilation Remembers John Kirby/The Big Small Bands, Fresh Sounds Records.
1960	Dave Pell Plays Lawrence Welk's Big Band Sounds	Dave Pell	Featuring Johnny Williams (piano) (organ); P.R.I.
1960	The Blues and the Beat	Henry Mancini	Featuring Johnny Williams (piano); RCA Victor; reissued in 1995, RCA.
1960	Pam Garner Sings Ballads for Broken Hearts	Pam Garner	Orchestra conducted by John Williams; Columbia; reissued for digital download in 2012, Vintage Masters Inc.
1960	For Pete's Sake	Pete Candoli	Featuring Johnny Williams (piano); Kapp Records.
1960	Bottoms Up	George Roberts	Conducted and Arranged by John T. Williams (piano); Columbia; reissued in the 2011 compilation Meet Mr. Roberts/Bottoms Up, Fresh Sound Records.
1960	I Believe	Mahalia Jackson	Orchestra & Chorus conducted by Johnny Williams; Columbia.
1961	Lush, Latin & Cool	Marty Paich	Featuring Johnny Williams (piano); RCA Victor; reissued in 1998, RCA.
1961	The Old South Wails	Dave Pell Octet	Featuring Johnny Williams or Marty Paich (piano); Capitol; (S)T1512; Recorded at Capitol Tower Studios, Hollywood, October 31, November 1&4, 1960; Released March 20, 1961; Reissued in 2013; Tracks "Tishomingo Blues" and "Manhattan" arranged by Johnny Williams
1961	Combo!	Henry Mancini	Conducted by Henry Mancini; featuring Johnny Williams (piano) (harpsichord); RCA Victor; reissued in 2007, Sony.
1961	Hell Bent for Leather!	Frankie Laine	Orchestra and chorus conducted by Johnny Williams; Columbia; reissued for digital download in 2012, Marathon Media International Ltd.
1961	Deuces Wild	Frankie Laine	Orchestra and chorus conducted by Johnny Williams; Columbia; reissued for digital download in 2013, Smith & Co.
1961	Everytime I Feel the Spirit	Mahalia Jackson	Orchestra and chorus conducted by Johnny Williams; Columbia; reissued for digital download in 2013, BNF Collection.
1962	Young and Lively	Vic Damone	Music Conducted Johnny Williams; Columbia; re-released in 1962, Columbia, Stereo; reissued in the 1996 compilation That Towering Feeling!/Young and Lively, Columbia; reissued for digital download in 2012, Hot Records Society.
1962	I Remember John Kirby	Dave Pell	Featuring Johnny Williams (piano) (organ); P.R.I.; reissued in the 2011 compilation Remembers John Kirby/The Big Small Bands, Fresh Sounds Records.
1962	Call of the Wild	Frankie Laine	Orchestra and chorus conducted by Johnny Williams; Columbia; CBS; reissued for digital download in 2013, Smith & Co.
1962	Great Songs of Love and Faith	Mahalia Jackson	Orchestra and chorus conducted by Johnny Williams; Columbia; reissued for digital download in 2013, Marathon Media International Ltd.
1962	Songs for Christmas: Silent Night	Mahalia Jackson	Orchestra and chorus conducted by Johnny Williams; Columbia; reissued in 2008, Sony.
1962	There Is Nothing Like a Dame	Pete Candoli	Featuring John Williams (piano) on some tracks; Warner Bros. Records.
1962	So Nice!	Johnny Desmond	Arranged, conducted by Johnny T. Williams (piano); reissued for digital download in 2010, Screenland Records.
1963	Wanderlust	Frankie Laine	Orchestra and chorus conducted by Johnny Williams; Columbia; CBS; reissued in 2015, Sony Mod.
1963	André Previn in Hollywood	André Previn	Featuring André Previn (piano); arrangements and musical direction by Johnny Williams; CBS; reissued in the 2014 compilation André Previn in Hollywood/Soft and Swinging, Vocalion.
1964	My Fair Lady with the Un-original Cast	Shelly Manne	Performed by Shelly Manne, His Men and Orchestra; arrangements and musical direction by Johnny Williams; Capitol Records; released in 1964, Capitol Records, Stereo.
1964	Sound Stage!	André Previn	Big band under the direction of Johnny Williams; CBS; reissued in 1976 The Jazz Piano of André Previn, Embassy Records; reissued in 2014, Vocalion.
1965	Manne–That's Gershwin!	Shelly Manne	Musical direction by Johnny Williams; Capitol Records; reissued in 1984, with musical direction by John T. Williams, Discovery Records.
1974	Here Comes Inspiration	Paul Williams	"Dream Away" Composed by Paul Williams & J. Williams; Arranged and Conducted by John Williams; A&M Records
1974	Serge Prokofiev: Sonata for Cello & Piano; David Ward-Steinman: Duo for Cello & Piano	Edgar Lustgarten	Featuring Edgar Lustgarten (cello) and John Williams (piano); reissued in 2006, Music for Cello and Piano by Sergei Prokofiev & David Ward-Steinman, Orion; reissued for digital download in 2007, Marquis Classics.
1984	The Official Music of the 1984 Games	Various Artists	CBS; also reissued as The Official Music of the XXIIIrd Olympiad Los Angeles 1984, CBS; reissued on CD in 1984, CBS/Sony/Japan.
1984	With a Song in My Heart	Jessye Norman	John Williams/Boston Pops, Philips; Love Is Here To Stay: featuring John Williams (piano); reissued for digital download in 2014, Decca.
1988	1988 Summer Olympics Album: One Moment in Time	Various Artists	Featuring an edited version of Olympic Spirit, the complete version is yet to be released; Arista
1992	Lucky to Be Me	Jessye Norman	Featuring John Williams (piano); Philips.
1997	Cinema Serenade	Itzhak Perlman	Pittsburgh Symphony Orchestra conducted by John Williams, Sony Classical; reissued in 2011 as K2 HD CD, Sony Classical; reissued as a SACD in 2015, Sony Classical
1998	Gershwin Fantasy	Joshua Bell	London Symphony Orchestra conducted by John Williams, Sony Classical; featuring John Williams (piano): Three Preludes; reissued in 2009 X2 Joshua Bell: Bernstein - Gershwin, Sony.
1999	Keisuke Wakao plays music of John Williams	Keisuke Wakao	Featuring John Williams (piano): The Days Between...; Denon.
1999	Cinema Serenade 2: The Golden Age	Itzhak Perlman	Boston Pops Orchestra conducted by John Williams, Sony Classical.
2002	Yo-Yo Ma Plays the Music of John Williams	Yo-Yo Ma	Recording Arts Orchestra of Los Angeles conducted by John Williams; Sony Classical; reissued in 2012, Sony Classical, remastered; reissued as a SACD in 2016, Sony Classical; Reissued in 2017 as 2-LP, Music On Vinyl.
2005	John Williams Clarinet Concerto	Michele Zukovsky	Clarinet Concerto: Los Angeles Philharmonic conducted by John Williams, recorded in 1991; David Blumberg Artists; reissued for digital download in 2010, Michele Zukovsky.
2009	Johhny Mercer: The Dream's on Me	Aura McDonald	Featuring John Williams (piano): I Had Myself a True Love, TCM.
2013	We'll Paint You a Rainbow	Christine Brewer	Somewhere Over the Rainbow conducted by John Williams.
2019	Hooten Plays Williams	Thomas Hooten	Music composed and conducted by John Williams/Recording Arts Orchestra of Los Angeles; Thomas Hooten.
2019	Across The Stars	Anne-Sophie Mutter	Music composed and conducted by John Williams/Recording Arts Orchestra of Los Angeles; Also released as a CD+DVD Deluxe Edition containing 5 bonus tracks; Deutsche Grammophon.
2022	A Gathering Of Friends	Yo-Yo Ma	Music composed and conducted by John Williams/New York Philharmonic; Sony Classical.
2022	Violin Concerto No. 2 & Selected Film Themes	Anne-Sophie Mutter	Music composed and conducted by John Williams/Boston Symphony Orchestra; Deutsche Grammophon.
2024	John Williams in Tokyo	Stéphane Denève	2-CD set, Music composed and conducted by John Williams & Stéphane Denève/Saito Kinen Orchestra; Live recording.

=== Soundtrack albums / Motion Picture Scores by Other Artists ===
Year	Album	Other artist(s)	Notes
1957	Funny Face	Adolph Deutsch	Featuring John Williams (piano); Verve; reissued in 1996, Verve; reissued in 2008, Hallmark; reissued in 2017 with previously unreleased material 60th Anniversary Edition, Verve.
1957	The James Dean Story	Leith Stevens	Featuring John T. Williams (piano); Capitol Records, W-881
1957	Sweet Smell of Success	Elmer Bernstein	Featuring John Williams (piano); music composed and conducted by Elmer Bernstein; Decca; reissued in 2008, Cherry Red Records; reissued in 2008, Fresh Sound Records.
1958	South Pacific	Alfred Newman	Featuring John Williams (piano); RCA Victor; reissued in 2000, RCA; reissued in 2010, Hallmark.
1958	Bell, Book and Candle	George Duning	Featuring John Williams (piano); Paramount; reissued in the 2006 compilation Bell, Book and Candle/1001 Arabian Nights, Film Score Monthly.
1958	The Music from Peter Gunn	Henry Mancini	Featuring Johnny T. Williams (piano); RCA Victor; reissued in 1958, RCA Victor; reissued in 1958, RCA Victor; reissued in 1999, Buddha Records; reissued in 2000, BMG; reissued in 2003, RCA Victor; Reissued for digital download in 2006, TP4 Music
1958	God's Little Acre	Elmer Bernstein	Composed and Conducted by Elmer Bernstein; featuring Johnny Williams (piano); United Artists Records; reissued in 2009, Kritzerland Records.
1958	The Big Country	Jerome Moross	Featuring John Williams (piano); RCA; reissued in 1991, Screen Archives Entertainment; reissued in 1995, Silva America; reissued in 2007, La-La land Records; reissued in 2008, MGM Records.
1959	Staccato	Elmer Bernstein	Featuring John Williams (piano); Capitol; reissued in 2008, DRG Records.
1959	Mr. Lucky	Henry Mancini	Featuring John Williams (piano); RCA; reissued in 1989, RCA; reissued in 2011, Fresh Sound Records.
1959	Porgy and Bess	André Previn	Featuring John Williams (piano); Columbia; reissued in 1995, Back Bitter (Germany); reissued in 2010, Hallmark.
1959	Some Like It Hot	Adolph Deutsch	Featuring John Williams (piano); United Artists; reissued in 1997, Ryko; reissued in 2004, Varèse Sarabande.
1959	The Music from M Squad	Stanley Wilson	Music Composed & Arranged by Benny Carter, Pete Carpenter and John Williams (piano); music conducted by Stanley Wilson; Phantom Records (England); reissued in 1996, RCA.
1959	More Music from Peter Gunn	Henry Mancini	Featuring Johnny T. Williams (piano); RCA Victor; reissued in 1995 & 2003, RCA Victor.
1960	Shotgun Slade - The Original Jazz Score	Stanley Wilson	Music composed and arranged by Gerald Fried; featuring Johnny Williams (piano); Mercury; reissued in 2016, Shotgun Slade + Burke's Law (2 LPs on 1 CD), Fresh Sound Records.
1960	The Apartment	Adolph Deutsch	Featuring John Williams (piano); United Artists; reissued in 2009, Kritzerland.
1961	West Side Story	Johnny Green	Featuring John Williams (piano); Columbia; reissued in 1992, Sony Masterworks; reissued in 2004, Sony Classical/Legacy.
1962	Hemingway's Adventures of a Young Man	Franz Waxman	Featuring John Williams (piano); RCA; reissued in 1985, Label X (Australia); reissued in the 2017 compilation Peyton Place/Hemingway's Adventures of a Young Man, La-La Land Records
1982	Yes, Giorgio	Luciano Pavarotti	Song "If We Were In Love" written by Alan and Marilyn Bergman/John Williams; orchestra conducted by Emerson Buckley and John Williams, London; reissued in 2004, Decca.
1998	The Magnificent Seven	Elmer Bernstein	Previously unreleased score (1960); featuring John Williams (piano); Rykodisc; Reissued in 2004, Colosseum VSD & Varèse Sarabande; Reissued for digital download in 2015, Soundtrack Factory; 2017, Broken Audio
2002	Studs Lonigan	Jerry Goldsmith	OST (1960); featuring John Williams (piano), Varèse Sarabande; reissued in 2011, Quartet Records.
2009	None But the Brave	Morris Stoloff	Previously unreleased score (1965); music by John Williams, conducted by Morris Stoloff; featuring John Williams (piano): Piano Theme bonus track; Film Score Monthly, FSM Vol. 12 No. 12.
2011	City of Fear	Jerry Goldsmith	Previously unreleased score (1959); featuring John Williams (piano); Columbia; Intrada Special Collection.
2017	Thunder Road - The Film Music of Jack Marshall	Jack Marshall	Previously unreleased original scores from Thunder Road (1958), Take a Giant Step (1959) and The Rabbit Trap (1959); Thunder Road: featuring John Williams (piano); La-La Land Records
2018	Solo: A Star Wars Story [Original Motion Picture Soundtrack]	John Powell	Music composed and conducted by John Powell, except The Adventures of Han composed and conducted by John Williams; Original Star Wars music by John Williams; reissued in 2020 as Deluxe Edition including additional demos composed and conducted by John Williams
2018	Superman II & III: Limited Edition	Ken Thorne	Some source tracks composed and conducted by John Williams; La-La Lands Records.
2021	Face of Fugitive	Jerry Goldsmith	Previously unreleased score (1959); featuring John Williams (piano); Intrada Special Collection ISC 466; Recorded December 1958; Released March 23, 2021

=== Soundtrack albums / Motion Picture Scores by Various Artists ===
Year	Album	Other artist(s)	Notes
1996	Land of the Giants	Various Artists	Previously unreleased scores (1968/1969); GNP Crescendo.
1997	The Time Tunnel	Various Artists	Previously unreleased score (1966); GNP Crescendo.
1998	Lost in Space, Vol. 2 [Original Television Soundtrack]	Various Artists	Previously unreleased score (1967); GNP Crescendo.
1999	Twilight Zone	Various Artists	Previously unreleased scores (1959-1964); featuring John Williams (piano); 4-CD set, Silva Treasury.
2000	Lost in Space, Vol. 3 [Original Television Soundtrack]	Various Artists	Previously unreleased scores (1965-1968); GNP Crescendo.
2006	Amazing Stories - Anthology 1	Various Artists	Previously unreleased scores (1985-1987); some tracks composed and conducted by John Williams; Intrada.
2006	Amazing Stories - Anthology 2	Various Artists	Previously unreleased scores (1985-1987); some tracks composed and conducted by John Williams; Intrada.
2007	Amazing Stories - Anthology 3	Various Artists	Previously unreleased scores (1985-1987); some tracks composed and conducted by John Williams; Intrada.
2010	TV Omnibus: Volume One (1962-1976)	Various Artists	Contains the previously unreleased score from The Eleventh Hour: The Bronze Locust (1963), music composed and conducted by Johnny Williams; Film Score Monthly, Vol. 13, No. 13.
2018	Land of the Giants 50th Anniversary Soundtrack Collection: Limited Edition	Various Artists	Some tracks composed and conducted by John Williams; La-La Lands Records.

=== Live albums (Collaborations & Featurings) ===
Year	Album	Other artist(s)	Notes
2012	Music from Angela's Ashes	Frank McCourt	Music composed and conducted by John Williams/Boston Pops Orchestra, recorded live at Koussevitzky Music Shed, August 5, 2000; digital download, BSO release.
2012	Lerner and Loewe: "My Fair Lady", arranged for singers and jazz orchestra by John Williams	Various Artists	Dianne Reeves and Brian Stokes Mitchell; conducted by John Williams/The Tanglewood Big Band Ensemble, recorded live at Seiji Ozawa Hall, August 9, 2004; digital download, BSO release.
2012	James Taylor And Friends	James Taylor	Conducted by John Williams/Boston Pops Esplanade Orchestra, recorded live at Koussevitzky Music Shed, August 30, 2009; digital download, BSO release.
2014	The Glenn Dicterow Collection	Glenn Dicterow	Glenn Dicterow, violin: Schindler's List: Main Theme recorded live, composed and conducted by John Williams; New York Philharmonic
2020	John Williams In Vienna	Anne-Sophie Mutter	Music composed and conducted by John Williams/Wiener Philharmoniker; Live recording; Deutsche Grammophon.

== Other album appearances ==
=== Audio stories ===
For reasons of relevance, this section deliberately excludes audiobooks. Over one hundred Star Wars audio books have been published since the 1990s, and most of them use the original music composed and performed by John Williams.

Year	Album	Other artist(s)	Notes
1977	The Story of Star Wars: From the Original Soundtrack	Various Artists	Original music from the motion picture composed and performed by John Williams; 20th Century Fox Records; reissued in 1977, Buena Vista Records; international releases in French, Spanish, German and Japanese.
1980	The Empire Strikes Back: The Adventures of Luke Skywalker	Various Artists	Original music from the motion picture composed and performed by John Williams; RSO; reissued in 1980 The Story Of The Empire Strikes Back, Star Wars - The Empire Strikes Back, Buena Vista Records; International releases in French, Spanish and German.
1981	Raiders of the Lost Ark: The Movie on Record	Various Artists	Original music from the motion picture composed and performed by John Williams; Columbia; international release in French.
1982	E.T. the Extra-Terrestrial	Michael Jackson	Original music from the motion picture composed and performed by John Williams; storybook narrated by Michael Jackson; MCA Records.
1983	The Story of Return of the Jedi	Various Artists	Original music from the motion picture composed and performed by John Williams; Buena Vista Records; reissued in 1983, Star Wars - Return of the Jedi, Buena Vista Records; international releases in French, Spanish and German.
1984	The Story of Indiana Jones and the Temple of Doom	Various Artists	Original music from the motion picture composed and performed by John Williams; Buena Vista Records; reissued in 1984, Indiana Jones and the Temple of Doom, Buena Vista Records; international release in French.
1989	The Story of Indiana Jones and the Last Crusade	Various Artists	Original music from the motion picture composed and performed by John Williams; Buena Vista Records; international release in French.
1993	The Original Radio Drama: Star Wars	Various Artists	Original music from the motion picture composed and performed by John Williams; 7-CD set, National Public Radio; reissued in 2013, Star Wars: A New Hope – The Original Radio Drama, Topps 'Light Side' Collector's Edition, Star Wars: A New Hope – The Original Radio Drama, Topps 'Dark Side' Collector's Edition, HighBridge Audio.
1993	The Original Radio Drama: The Empire Strikes Back	Various Artists	Original music from the motion picture composed and performed by John Williams; 5-CD set, National Public Radio.
1993	The Original Radio Drama: Return of the Jedi	Various Artists	Original music from the motion picture composed and performed by John Williams; 3-CD set, National Public Radio.
1996	Star Wars: The Collector's Limited Edition Trilogy	Various Artists	Original music from the motion picture composed and performed by John Williams; The Original Radio Drama (15-CD set), HighBridge Audio, Compilation; reissued in 2007, Star Wars: The Complete Trilogy (15-CD), HighBridge Audio, Compilation.
1999	Star Wars: Crimson Empire	Various Artists	Original music from the motion picture composed and performed by John Williams; audio drama (2-CD); contains the unreleased longer version of the Finale from The Empire Strikes Back; HighBridge Company.

=== Various artist compilation albums ===
Year	Title(s)	Album	Notes
1961	"Theme From 'Checkmate'"	Twelve Big Hits!	Composed and conducted by Johnny Williams; Columbia.
1985	"Main Title (Theme From Jaws)", "Flying (From E.T., The Extra-Terrestrial)", "The River (From The River)", "Over The Moon (From E.T., The Extra-Terrestrial)".	Movie Greats	Some tracks composed and conducted by John Williams; MCA.
1986	"Maria", "The Second Time Around", "The Pleasure Of Her Company"	On The Street Where You Live: Vic Damone's Best	With Vic Damone; some tracks conducted by John Williams, CBS.
1990	"Jerom Kern: Very warm for May", "Richard Rodgers: Spring is here", "George Gershwin: Love is here to stay", "Cole Porter: In the still of the night"	The Jessye Norman Collection	With Jessye Norman; some tracks conducted by John Williams/Boston Pops, Philips.
1991	"Born on the Fourth of July (remix)"	Reel Music (Soundtrack Sampler From MCA)	Composed and conducted by John Williams; MCA, 2-CD promo compilation.
1992	"Love is here to stay"	Classics	With Jessye Norman; John Williams, piano, Philips.
1992	"Somewhere In My Memory", "Merry Christmas, Merry Christmas", "Christmas Star"	Home Alone 2 Lost In New York - Original Soundtrack Album	Some tracks composed and conducted by John Williams; "Somewhere In My Memory" performed by Bette Midler; Arista/BMG Special Products.
1993	"Fanfare for the Common Man", "West Side Story: Selection", "A String of Pearls"	Great Concert Halls of the World: Symphony Hall, Boston	Some tracks conducted by John Williams/Boston Pops, Philips.
1993	"Somewhere In My Memory", "Merry Christmas, Merry Christmas", "Carol Of The Bells"	Home Alone Christmas	Some tracks composed and conducted by John Williams; Arista/BMG Special Products.
1994	"Candide: Make our garden grow"	Greatest Hits - Bernstein	Conducted by John Williams/Boston Pops Orchestra, Sony.
1994	"The Washington Post March", "Colonel Bogey March", "The Raider's March from Raiders of the Lost Ark", etc.	Marches - Greatest Hits	Some tracks composed and conducted by John Williams/Boston Pops Orchestra, Sony.
1994	"Strike up the band"	Gershwin - Greatest Hits	Conducted by John Williams/Boston Pops Orchestra, Sony.
1994		The Jazz Sound From Peter Gunn	With Henry Mancini; Johnny T. Williams, piano, Fresh Sound Records.
1995	"Maid With The Flaxen Hair", "Suite bergamasque - Clair de lune"	Debussy For Daydreaming	Conducted by John Williams/Boston Pops Orchestra, Philips.
1995	"Simple Gifts"	Ballet - Greatest Hits	Conducted by John Williams/Boston Pops Orchestra, Sony.
1996	"Copland: Fanfare For The Common Man", "Gould: American Salute", "America, The Beautiful", etc.	Boston Pops: America the Beautiful	Some tracks conducted by John Williams/Boston Pops Orchestra, Philips; reissued for digital download in 2014, Decca.
1996	"Maid With The Flaxen Hair", "Suite bergamasque - Clair de lune"	Quiet Music for Quiet Times	Conducted by John Williams/Boston Pops Orchestra, Philips.
1996	"The Flying Theme (E.T.)", "We're Off To See The Wizard", "When You Wish Upon A Star", etc.	Boston Pops: Wish Upon a Star	Some tracks composed and conducted by John Williams/Boston Pops Orchestra, Philips.
1996	"Theme from Lost in Space, The Time Tunnel, The Land of Giants, etc."	The Fantasy Worlds of Irwin Allen [Original Television Soundtracks]	6-CD, some tracks composed and conducted by John Williams, GNP Crescendo.
1996	"Theme from Lost in Space, The Time Tunnel, The Land of Giants, etc."	The Fantasy Worlds of Irwin Allen: Special Bonus Disc	Some tracks composed and conducted by John Williams, GNP Crescendo.
1997	"Superman - Love Theme", etc.	Boston Pops: Romance Classics	Some tracks composed and conducted by John Williams/Boston Pops Orchestra, Philips.
1997	"NBC News Theme (a.k.a The Mission)", etc.	The Music of NBC News Volume II	Some tracks composed and conducted by John Williams; NBC News, Promo CD.
1998	"Sleigh Ride", "We Wish You a Merry Christmas"	I'll Be Home For Christmas	Some tracks conducted by John Williams/Boston Pops Orchestra; Sony.
1999	"End Credits & End Titles (from Family Plot)"	Alfred Hitchcock Presents... Signatures in Suspense	Composed and conducted by John Williams; Hip-O Records.
1999	"2001: A Space Odyssey (Also Sprach Zarathustra-Intro)", "Star Wars (Main Title)", "Jaws: Main Title (Theme)", etc.	Reel Blockbusters	Some tracks composed and conducted by John Williams; Hip-O Records.
1999	"Adventures of Robin Hood: Robin Hood and His Merry Men", "Star Wars, Episode 4 - A New Hope: Main Theme", "Star Wars, Episode 5 - The Empire Strikes Back: The Imperial March"	Music In Film	Some tracks composed and conducted by John Williams; Sony Classical.
1999	"Interlude (Night in Tunisia)", "Four" and "Early autumn"	The Complete Anita O'Day Verve/Clef Sessions	With Anita O`Day Featuring John Williams (piano); Mosaic Records, MD9-188, Compilation
2000	"Long Ago (And Far Away)" and "I've Never Been In Love Before"	The Complete Capitol Four Freshmen Fifties Sessions	With The Four Freshmen Featuring John Williams (harpsichord & celeste); Mosaic Records, MD9-203, Compilation
2000	"Saving Private Ryan: Hymn To The Fallen"	Critic's Choice: Leonard Maltin's Best Movie Themes of the '90s	Composed and conducted by John Williams; Atlantic.
2000	"NBC News Theme (a.k.a The Mission)", etc.	The Music of NBC News 2000	Some tracks composed and conducted by John Williams; NBC News, promo CD.
1999	"Presumed Innocent: End Credits", "Stanley & Iris: End Credits", "The Cowboys: Main Title"	Great Composers: John Williams	Some tracks conducted by John Williams; Varèse Sarabande.
2000		Don't Make Waves/Penelope	Penelope's music composed and conducted by John Williams (1966); Chapter III.
2011		Music from M Squad/The Music From Mickey Spillane's 'Mike Hammer'	With Stanley Wilson; M Squad: some tracks composed by John Williams (p); Collectables Records; reissued in 2014, Fresh Sound Records.
2001	"American Collection Theme"	Classic Yo-Yo	With Yo-Yo Ma; previously unreleased recording with the Recording Arts Orchestra of Los Angeles; Sony Classical.
2002	"Schindler's List: Main Theme", "Now, Voyager: Main Theme", "Four Horsemen of the Apocalypse: Main Theme", etc.	Classic Perlman: Rhapsody	With Itzhak Perlman; some tracks composed and conducted by John Williams; Sony Classical.
2002	" Saving Private Ryan - Hymn to the Fallen", " Raiders of the Lost Ark - Raiders of the Lost Ark"	Paramount Pictures' 90th Anniversary Memorable Scores	Some tracks composed and conducted by John Williams; Sony Classical.
2002	"Battle Hymn Of The Republic", "Gould-American Salute"	Mark Twain's America	Some tracks conducted by John Williams; Decca.
2002	"Sabrina: End Credits"	Great Movie Love Themes	Composed and conducted by John Williams; Varèse Sarabande.
2003	"Stanley & Iris: End Credits"	Varèse Sarabande: A 25th Anniversary Celebration	Composed and conducted by John Williams; Varèse Sarabande.
2003	"Presumed Innocent: End Credits"	Varese Sarabande: A 25th Anniversary Celebration, Vol. 2	Composed and conducted by John Williams; Varèse Sarabande.
2003	"Across The Stars (from Star Wars Episode II)"	Classics For A New Century	Composed and conducted by John Williams; Sony.
2003	"La fille aux cheveux de lin"	Debussy - Greatest Hits	Conducted by John Williams/Boston Pops Orchestra, Decca.
2003	"America The Beautiful", "This Land Is Your Land", "Liberty Fanfare"	Enduring Freedom - America's Greatest Hits	Some tracks composed and conducted by John Williams/Boston Pops Orchestra, Decca.
2004	"Because", "Whither Thou Goest", "Trees", etc.	Come on Children, Let's Sing/Great Songs of Love and Faith	With Mahalia Jackson; some tracks Conducted by John Williams, Sony.
2004	"Strike up the Band"	Gershwin: Strike Up the Band; Piano Concerto in F; Three Preludes; etc.	Conducted by John Williams/Boston Pops Orchestra, Universal Classics.
2004	"This Land Is Your Land", "American Salute"	America's Greatest Hits	Some tracks conducted by John Williams/Boston Pops Orchestra, Universal.
2004	"Strike up the Band"	Gershwin Without Words	Conducted by John Williams/Boston Pops Orchestra, Decca.
2004	"Gershwin: Strike Up The Band", "Gershwin: Selections From 'Girl Crazy'"	Gershwin - Greatest Hits	Some tracks conducted by John Williams/Boston Pops Orchestra, Decca.
2005		Lost in Space 40th Anniversary Edition	Some tracks composed and conducted by John Williams; La-La Land Records.
2005	"Falling in Love With Love", "In the Still of the Night", "Spring Is Here", etc.	The Jessye Norman Collection - The Songbooks	With Jessye Norman; including the albums With a Song in My Heart & Lucky to Be Me; conducted and performed by John Williams/Boston Pops; Phillips.
2005	"Old and Lost Rivers"	Classical Cuisine - American Barbeque	Conducted by John Williams/London Symphony Orchestra, Sony.
2005	"Worry-go-round", "The boy next door", "Body and soul", "Out of nowhere", "Coquette"	Don Fagerquist: Portrait Of A Great Jazz Artist	With Russell Garcia and His Orchestra; John Williams, piano; Fresh Sound Records.
2005		Los Angeles River	With Russell Garcia and His Orchestra; piano on some tracks: John Williams; Fresh Sound Records.
2005		The James Dean Story (Sights and Sounds from a Legendary Life)	With Leith Stevens; Featuring John T. Williams (piano) on CD 1 (The James Dean Story (Original Music Soundtrack); Blue Moon, BMCD 4104, Compilation, Special 50th Anniversary Commemorative Collection
2006	"Star Wars, Episode IV – A New Hope: Main Title", "E.T. The Extra-Terrestrial: Flying Theme", "Jaws: Theme", "Close Encounters of the Third Kind: The Dialogue"	The Essential Hollywood	Some tracks by John Williams & The London Symphony Orchestra; Sony Classical.
2006	"Fantasy for violin & orchestra on Porgy and Bess", "Preludes (3) for piano", "I Got Rhythm", etc.	The Joshua Bell Collection	With Joshua Bell; including the 1998 album Gershwin Fantasy conducted and performed by John Williams/London Symphony Orchestra; Sony Classical.
2006		Not With My Wife, You Don't!/Any Wednesday	Not With My Wife, You Don't!: music composed and conducted by John Williams; Film Score Monthly.
2006		Diamond Head/Gone With the Wave	Diamond Head's music composed and conducted by John Williams; Film Score Monthly.
2006		Bell, Book and Candle/1001 Arabian Nights	With George Duning; piano on Bell, Book and Candle: John Williams; Film Score Monthly.
2006	"Home Alone: Holiday Flight", "Home Alone: The House"	Fox Music: Top Shelf Library	5-CD; Fox Music.
2006	"With a song in my heart"	Between Love And Loss	With Jessye Norman; conducted by John Williams/Boston Pops, Philips.
2007	"Allegro ben ritmato e deciso from Three Preludes", "Nice Work If You Can Get It", "I Got Rhythm", "Love Is Here To Stay"	The Essential Joshua Bell	With Joshua Bell; excerpts from the 1998 album Gershwin Fantasy conducted and performed by John Williams/London Symphony Orchestra, Sony Classical.
2007	"We wish you a merry Christmas"	The Ultimate Classical Christmas	Conducted by John Williams/Boston Pops Orchestra; Sony.
2007	"Going to School"	Appassionato	With Yo-Yo Ma; composed and accompanied on the piano by John Williams; Sony Classical.
2007		Exploring New Sounds	With Pete Rugolo and His Orchestra; piano on some tracks: John T. Williams; Fresh Sound Records.
2008	"Theme From Superman", "Prelude and Main Title", "The Planet Krypton", etc.	Superman: The Music	8-CD set, includes previously unreleased material; Superman: The Movie - music composed and conducted by John Williams; Superman II - music composed and conducted by Ken Thorne, from original material Composed by John Williams; Superman III - music composed and conducted by Ken Thorne, original Superman themes by John Williams; Superman IV: The Quest for Peace - music by John Williams, adapted and conducted by Alexander Courage; Film Score Monthly.
2009	"Memoirs of a Geisha Suite"	Yo-Yo Ma - 30 Years Outside the Box	With Yo-Yo Ma; previously unreleased performance recorded live in 2008, with the Chicago Symphony Orchestra conducted by John Williams; Sony.
2009	"With a song in my heart"	Honor! A celebration of the African American Cultural Legacy	With Jessye Norman; conducted by John Williams/Boston Pops, Decca.
2010	"Theme From Superman"	The Music Of DC Comics: 75th Anniversary Collection	Composed and conducted by John Williams, WaterTower Music
2011	"The Poseidon Adventure: Main Title", "The Paper Chase: End Title", "Conrack: Main Title", "The Fury: For Gillian/End Title"	20th Century Fox: 75 Years of Great Film Music	Some tracks composed and conducted by John Williams; Colosseum/Varèse Sarabande.
2011	"Jaws: Main Titles/First Victim Theme"	Creepy Classics: Halloween's Greatest Hits	Composed and conducted by John Williams, Deutsche Grammophon.
2011	"Out of Africa: Love Theme", "Star Wars: Princess Leia's Theme"	Classic Love At The Movies	Some tracks composed and conducted by John Williams/Boston Pops Orchestra, Decca.
2011	"This Land Is Your Land", "Copland: Rodeo - Hoe-Down", "Gould: American Salute", "America, The Beautiful"	Celebrate America - Songs for the 4th of July	Some tracks conducted by John Williams/Boston Pops Orchestra, Decca.
2011		Remembers John Kirby/The Big Small Bands	With Dave Pell; piano and organ on The Big Small Bands: Johnny Williams; Fresh Sound Records.
2011		Meet Mr. Roberts/Bottoms Up	With George Roberts And His Big Bass Trombone; Bottoms Up: conducted and arranged by John T. Williams (p); Fresh Sound Records.
2011	"Seven Years in Tibet"	Impressions	With Yo-Yo Ma; composed and conducted by John Williams; Sony Classical; reissued in 2012, Sony Classical, remastered
2014	"Les parapluies de Cherbourg: I Will Wait for You", "Henry V: Orchestral Suite - no 4, Touch her soft lips and part", "Modern Times: Smile", etc.	Concertos, Sonatas and more...	With Itzhak Perlman; some tracks composed and conducted by John Williams; Sony Classical.
2014		André Previn in Hollywood/Soft and Swinging	With André Previn; André Previn in Hollywood: arrangements and musical direction by Johnny Williams; Vocalion.
2014		Calypso/Belafonte Sings The Caribbean	With Harry Belafonte; piano on Calypso: John T. Williams (uncredited); Jackpot Records.
2014	"Little David Play On Your Harp", "The Love Of God", "I Want To Be A Christian", etc.	Complete Mahalia Jackson Vol.12 - 1961	With Mahalia Jackson; including the 1962 album Everytime I Feel The Spirit conducted by John Williams, Fremeaux & Associes.
2014		Johnny Staccato/The Man With The Golden Arm	With Elmer Bernstein; Staccato: featuring John Williams (p); Fresh Sound Records.
2015		Lost in Space 50th Anniversary Soundtrack Collection	12-CD set, includes previously unreleased material; aome tracks composed and conducted by John Williams; other music by Hans J. Salter, Herman Stein, Richard LaSalle, Frank Comstock, Fred Steiner, Jeff Alexander, Warren Barker, Leith Stevens, Alexander Courage, Robert Drasnin, Cyril J. Mockridge, Gerald Fried, Pete Rugolo and Joseph Mullendore; La-La Land Records.
2015		Checkmate/Hong Kong	With Lionel Newman; "Checkmate" tracks composed and conducted by Johnny Williams; Fresh Sound Records.
2015		Rhythm in Motion/So Nice! with Johnny Desmond	With Johnny Desmond; music arranged and conducted by Johnny Williams; some tracks featuring Johnny Williams (p); three bonus tracks composed and performed by Johnny Williams: "Tuesday's Theme"; "The Black Knight"; "Augie's Great Piano"; Fresh Sound Records.
2016	"The Flying Sequence / Can You Read My Mind (Feat. Margot Kidder)", "Lex Luthor's Lair"	The Music Of DC Comics: Volume 2	Composed and conducted by John Williams, WaterTower Music
2017	"Olympic Hymn"	Bernstein: Chamber & Concert Music	Conducted by John Williams/Boston Pops Orchestra; Sony.
2017	"Olympic Hymn"	Leonard Bernstein: The Composer	Conducted by John Williams/Boston Pops Orchestra; Sony.
2017	"Theme (from Sugarland Express)"	The Real... Toots Thielemans	With Toots Thielemans; conducted by John Williams/Boston Pops Orchestra; Legacy Recordings.
2017		Peyton Place/Hemingway's Adventures of a Young Man	With Franz Waxman; Hemingway's Adventures of a Young Man: featuring Johnny Williams (p); La-La Land Records
2017	"Treesong", "Concerto for Violin and Orchestra", "Three Pieces from Schindler's List for Solo Violin and Orchestra"	Boston Symphony Orchestra: Complete Recordings on Deutsche Grammophon	"Treesong, Violin concerto": music composed and conducted by John Williams/BSO, Deutsche Grammophon
2017		Harry Potter: Original Motion Picture Soundtracks I-V	Harry Potter and the Sorcerer's Stone (2001), Harry Potter and the Chamber of Secrets (2002), Harry Potter and the Prisoner of Azkaban (2004): composed and conducted by John Williams; Harry Potter and the Goblet of Fire (2005): composed and conducted by Patrick Doyle; Harry Potter and the Order of the Phoenix (2007): composed by Nicholas Hooper; Rhino
2017	"Fantasy For Violin And Orchestra On Porgy And Bess", "Three Preludes", "Songs For Violin And Orchestra", etc.	Joshua Bell: The Classical Collection	"Gershwin Fantasy": music conducted by John Williams/London SO, Sony Classical
2017	"Season One And Two Main Title Theme", "Season One And Two End Title Theme", "Season Three Main Title Theme", etc.	Lost in Space: Title Themes from the Hit TV Series	Some tracks composed and conducted by John Williams, Spacelab9.
2022	"Theme from Schindler's List", ""Flight to Neverland" from Hook"	Hollywood Bowl 100: The First 100 Years Of Music	Live Recording. Some tracks composed and conducted by John Williams/Los Angeles Philharmonic Orchestra, Los Angeles Philharmonic Association. ("Theme from Schindler's List" recorded September 4, 2016 & "Flight to Neverland" recorded September 2, 2018)

== Video albums ==
- 2002 E.T.: The Extra-Terrestrial (2-Disc Limited Collector's Edition). Special features: John Williams performs the "E.T." score live with the film at the Shrine Auditorium 2002 Premiere (Universal Studios Home Entertainment)
- 2007 Broadway's Best at Pops. Arthur Fiedler, John Williams and Keith Lockhart/Boston Pops (PBS)
- 2009 Clint Eastwood Presents - Johnny Mercer: The Dream's on Me. Jamie Cullum, Morgan Eastwood, Audra McDonald, John Williams, etc. (TCM)
- 2013 Tanglewood 75th Anniversary Celebration. Keith Lockhart, John Williams, Stefan Asbury, Andris Nelsons, etc./Boston Pops, Tanglewood Music Center Orchestra, Boston Symphony Orchestra (C Major Entertainment)
- 2015 A John Williams Celebration . Gustavo Dudamel/Los Angeles Philharmonic, John Williams as guest conductor and Itzhak Perlman on violin (C Major Entertainment)
- 2019 Across The Stars (CD+DVD Deluxe Edition). DVD: Anne-Sophie Mutter In Conversation With John Williams; Mutter, Recording Arts Orchestra of Los Angeles/Williams (Deutsche Grammophon)
- 2020 John Williams In Vienna. Mutter, John Williams/Wiener Philharmoniker; Live recording (Deutsche Grammophon)
- 2022 The Berlin Concert. John Williams/The Berliner Philharmoniker; Live recording (Deutsche Grammophon)
- 2024 John Williams In Tokyo. John Williams & Stéphane Denève/Saito Kinen Orchestra; Live recording (Deutsche Grammophon)

== Discography as composer ==
John Williams himself recorded most of his compositions. However, there are some exceptions, and this section is therefore complementary to the main discography. In addition, it presents a special section dedicated to each of his concert works that have been recorded. As Williams' film works are loved by the public, they were much recorded and continue to be, so another section containing selections of some his works recorded by other artists is also featured.

=== Soundtracks conducted by others ===
Year	Album	Label	Notes
1959	Wagon Train [Original TV Music From]	Mercury Records	Some tracks composed by Johnny Williams. Music conducted by Stanley Wilson; reissued for digital download in 2011, Red Bitch Music.
1959	The Music From M Squad	RCA Victor	Some tracks composed by Johnny Williams. Music conducted by Stanley Wilson; reissued in 1996, RCA Victor.
1981	Thomas and the King (Musical)	TER	Music by John Williams, lyrics by James Harbert, book by Edward Anhalt; orchestrations by Herbert W. Spencer, conducted by Ian Macpherson; reissued in 1998, Jay Records.
2002	Harry Potter and the Chamber of Secrets [Original Motion Picture Soundtrack]	Atlantic	Music by John Williams, adapted and conducted by William Ross; Released in 2002 as "For Your Consideration" Academy Promo CD; Reissued for digital download in 2005, Atlantic Records; Reissued in 2018 as 2-LP, Nonesuch/Warner Sunset Records
2008	Superman IV: The Quest for Peace (Superman: The Music)	Film Score Monthly	Previously unreleased score (1987); Music by John Williams, adapted and conducted by Alexander Courage; available in the 8-CD set "Superman: The Music"; Reissued as 2-CD in 2018, La-La Land Records.
2009	None But the Brave	Film Score Monthly	Previously unreleased score (1965); music by John Williams, Conducted by Morris Stoloff; "Piano on Piano Theme" bonus track: Johnny Williams.
2019	Star Wars: Galaxy's Edge Symphonic Suite	Walt Disney Records	Digital Single; Music by John Williams, inspired by the Disney Themed Land, conducted by William Ross.

=== Soundtracks using John Williams' themes ===
Year	Album	Label	Notes
1980	Airplane!	Regency	Music composed and conducted by Elmer Bernstein, original Jaws theme by John Williams.
1980	Superman II	Warner Bros.	Music composed and conducted by Ken Thorne, from original material composed by John Williams.
1983	Superman III	Warner Bros.	Music composed and conducted by Ken Thorne, original Superman themes by John Williams.
1984	Supergirl	Varèse Sarabande	Music composed and Conducted by Jerry Goldsmith, original Superman theme by John Williams.
1986	Ewoks	Varèse Sarabande	Music composed by Peter Bernstein, original "Parade of the Ewoks" theme by John Williams.
1996	Star Wars: Shadows of the Empire	Varèse Sarabande	Music composed by Joel McNeely, original Star Wars themes by John Williams.
2000	Jaws: The Revenge	MSML	Previously unreleased score (1987); music composed and conducted by Michael Small, original Jaws theme by John Williams.
2001	Jurassic Park III	Universal	Original themes by John Williams, new music composed and conducted by Don Davis.
2003	Star Wars Knights of the Old Republic Video Game Soundtrack	Sony Classical	Music composed by Jeremy Soule, original Star Wars themes by John Williams.
2005	Harry Potter and the Goblet of Fire	Warner Bros. Records	Music composed and conducted by Patrick Doyle, original "Hedwig's Theme" by John Williams.
2006	Superman Returns	Rhino Entertainment Company	Music composed by John Ottman, original Superman themes by John Williams.
2007	Harry Potter and the Order of the Phoenix	Warner Sunset Records	Music composed by Nicholas Hooper, original "Hedwig's Theme" by John Williams.
2008	Star Wars: The Force Unleashed	Force Records	Music composed by Mark Griskey, original Star Wars themes by John Williams.
2008	Star Wars: The Clone Wars	Sony Classical	Music composed and Conducted by Kevin Kiner, original Star Wars themes and Score by John Williams.
2009	Harry Potter and the Half-Blood Prince	New Line Records	Music composed by Nicholas Hooper, original themes by John Williams.
2010	Harry Potter and the Deathly Hallows Part 1	WaterTower Music	Music composed by Alexandre Desplat, original "Hedwig's Theme" by John Williams.
2011	Harry Potter and the Deathly Hallows Part 2	WaterTower Music	Music composed by Alexandre Desplat, original themes by John Williams.
2013	Superman Returns [Music From The Motion Picture-Expanded Edition]	La-La Land Records	Music Composed by John Ottman, Original Superman Themes by John Williams including previously unreleased track "Return To Kryption (Synth Mockup)".
2013	Indiana Jones and the Fate of Atlantis	Rich Douglas	Music arranged by Rich Douglas and composed by Clint Bajakian, Peter McConnell & Michael Land, original "Raider's March Theme" by John Williams.
2014	Star Wars: The Clone Wars – Original Soundtrack Seasons One Through Six	Walt Disney Records	Music composed and conducted by Kevin Kiner, original Star Wars themes and score by John Williams.
2014	Phineas and Ferb: Star Wars – Original Soundtrack	Walt Disney Records	Music composed and songs written by Danny Jacob, original Star Wars themes and score by John Williams.
2015	Jaws 3-D	Intrada Special Collection	Previously unreleased score (1983); music composed by Alan Parker, original Jaws theme by John Williams.
2015	Jurassic World	Backlot Music 605	Music composed by Michael Giacchino, original Jurassic Park themes by John Williams.
2016	Star Wars: Rebels – Season One	Walt Disney Records	Music composed and conducted by Kevin Kiner, original Star Wars themes and score by John Williams.
2016	Star Wars: Rebels – Season Two	Walt Disney Records	Music composed and conducted by Kevin Kiner, original Star Wars themes and score by John Williams.
2016	Fantastic Beasts and Where to Find Them	Sony Classical/WaterTown Music	Music composed by James Newton Howard, original "Hedwig's Theme" by John Williams.
2016	Rogue One: A Star Wars Story – Original Motion Picture Soundtrack	Walt Disney Records	Music composed by Michael Giacchino, original Star Wars music by John Williams.
2017	Justice League	Sony Classical/WaterTower Music	Music composed by Danny Elfman, original Superman theme by John Williams.
2018	Lost in Space – Original Series Soundtrack	Lakeshore Records	Music composed by Christopher Lennertz, original Lost in Space theme by John Williams.
2018	Jurassic World: Fallen Kingdom – Original Motion Picture Soundtrack	Backlot Music	Music composed by Michael Giacchino, original Jurassic Park themes by John Williams.
2018	Ralph Breaks the Internet	Walt Disney Records	Music composed by Henry Jackman, original "The Imperial March" from The Empire Strikes Back by John Williams.
2018	Fantastic Beasts: The Crimes of Grindelwald	Sony Classical/WaterTown Music	Music composed by James Newton Howard, original "Hedwig's Theme" by John Williams.
2022	Fantastic Beasts: The Secrets of Dumbledore	Sony Classical/WaterTown Music	Music composed by James Newton Howard, original "Hedwig's Theme" by John Williams.
2022	Jurassic World: Dominion – Original Motion Picture Soundtrack	Backlot Music	Music composed by Michael Giacchino, original Jurassic Park themes by John Williams.
2023	Rogers: The Musical	Hollywood Records/Marvel Music	Score composed and lyrics written by Christopher Lennertz, Alan Menken and Marc Shaiman with David Zippel, Scott Wittman, Jordan Peterson and Alex Karukas, original "The Imperial March" from The Empire Strikes Back by John Williams.
2025	Jurassic World: Rebirth – Original Motion Picture Soundtrack	Backlot Music	Music composed by Alexandre Desplat, original Jurassic Park themes by John Williams.
2025	Superman	WaterTower Music	Music composed by John Murphy and David Fleming, original Superman theme by John Williams.

=== Concert works ===
Composition year	Work title	Premiere date	Premiere performers	Released year	Album	Notes
1965	Prelude and Fugue	1965-03-29	Stan Kenton/L.A. Neophonic Orchestra	1965	Stan Kenton Conducts the Los Angeles Neophonic Orchestra, Capitol Records; reissued in 1998, Capitol Jazz.	
1965	Essay for Strings	1965-12-06	André Previn/Huston Symphony	2002	John Williams Trumpet Concerto featuring Arturo Sandoval recording (Ronald Feldman/London Symphony)	
1965	Essay for Strings	1965-12-06	André Previn/Huston Symphony	2013	American Masters (Dirk Brosse/Chamber Orchestra of Philadelphia) (digital download)	
1965	Prelude and Fugue	1965-03-29	Stan Kenton/L.A. Neophonic Orchestra	2006	Family Album (Michael J. Colburn/U.S. Marine Band)	
1968	Sinfonietta for Wind Ensemble		Donald Hunsberger/Eastman Wind Ensemble	1968	Krzysztof Penderecki: Pittsburgh Overture / Toshiro Mayuzumi: Music With Sculpture / John T. Williams: Sinfonietta For Wind Ensemble; Deutsche Grammophon; reissued in Japan in 2005 (Donald Hunsberger/Eastman Wind Ensemble)	Composed in 1968 for the Eastman Wind Ensemble
1969	Concerto for Flute and Orchestra	1981	Leonard Slatkin/Saint Louis Symphony Orchestra – St. Louis	1992	Violin Concerto/Flute Concerto (Leonard Slatkin/London Symphony – Peter Lloyd, flute, recorded in 1983); reissued for digital download in 2014, Varèse Sarabande.	Composed in 1969, remained unperformed until 1981
1971	A Nostalgic Jazz Odyssey	1971	Donald Hunsberger/Eastman Wind Ensemble – Eastman, Georgia	2015	John Williams For Winds – Music for Cinema and Beyond (The United States Coast Guard Band, Captain Kenneth W. Megan) (free audio streaming)	Composed for the Eastman Wind Ensemble
1976	Concerto for Violin and Orchestra	1981-01-29	Leonard Slatkin/Saint Louis Symphony – Mark Peskanov, Violin – St. Louis	1992	Violin Concerto/Flute Concerto (Leonard Slatkin/London Symphony – Mark Peskanov, Violin; recorded in 1983); reissued for digital download in 2014, Varèse Sarabande.	Composed at the suggestion of the late Barbara Ruick, first wife of the composer, begun in 1974, shortly after her death, and finished in 1976
1976	Concerto for Violin and Orchestra, rev. 1998	1981-01-29	Leonard Slatkin/Saint Louis Symphony – Mark Peskanov, Violin – St. Louis	2001	Treesong (John Williams/Boston Symphony Orchestra – Gil Shaham on violin)	Composed at the suggestion of the late Barbara Ruick, first wife of the composer, begun in 1974, shortly after her death, and finished in 1976
1976	Concerto for Violin and Orchestra, rev. 1998	1981-01-29	Leonard Slatkin/Saint Louis Symphony – Mark Peskanov, Violin – St. Louis	2011	Digital release (Leonard Slatkin/Detroit Symphony – Emmanuelle Boisvert, Violin)	Composed at the suggestion of the late Barbara Ruick, first wife of the composer, begun in 1974, shortly after her death, and finished in 1976
1980	Fanfare for a Festive Occasion	1980-11-14	Max Hobart/Boston Civic	2011	Sound the Bells! – American Premières for Brass (Alasdair Neale/The Bay Brass)	Composed in 1980 for the Boston Civic Orchestra
1980	Jubilee 350 Fanfare	1980-09-21	John Williams/Boston Pops – Boston	2002	American Journey (John Williams/Recording Arts Orchestra of Los Angeles)	Composed in 1980, in celebration of the City of Boston's 350th anniversary. Subtitled "To the City of Boston".
1981	Pops on the March	1981-04-28	John Williams/Boston Pops – Boston	1991	I Love A Parade (John Williams/Boston Pops)	Originally commissioned by Arthur Fiedler in 1978, but only composed in 1981
1982	America, the Dream Goes On	1983	John Williams/Boston Pops – Boston	1985	America, The Dream Goes On (John Williams/Boston Pops)	Composed in 1982, with lyrics by Alan and Marilyn Bergman, for solo vocal, chorus and orchestra
1982	America, the Dream Goes On	1983	John Williams/Boston Pops – Boston	1990	America, the Dream Goes on (Andrew Lane/Orlando Pops); Same recording on 'John Williams, the Dream Goes on' (Andrew Lane/Orlando Pops), 1997.	Composed in 1982, with lyrics by Alan and Marilyn Bergman, for solo vocal, chorus and orchestra
1982	America, the Dream Goes On	1983	John Williams/Boston Pops – Boston	2002	The Dream Goes On (Ralph M. Gambone/United States Navy Band & Sea Chanters Chorus)	Composed in 1982, with lyrics by Alan and Marilyn Bergman, for solo vocal, chorus and orchestra
1982	America, the Dream Goes On	1983	John Williams/Boston Pops – Boston	2008	United States Air Force Band of Mid-America: Infinite Horizons (United States Air Force Band of Mid-America/Jones)	Composed in 1982, with lyrics by Alan and Marilyn Bergman, for solo vocal, chorus and orchestra
1982	America, the Dream Goes On	1983	John Williams/Boston Pops – Boston	2009	Let Freedom Sing! - An Independence Celebration (Steve Cramer)	Composed in 1982, with lyrics by Alan and Marilyn Bergman, for solo vocal, chorus and orchestra
1982	America, the Dream Goes On	1983	John Williams/Boston Pops – Boston	2009	Encore Collection - The Many Sounds Of The Mormon Tabernacle Choir (Craig Jessop) (Also available on the standalone album Spirit of America, which is the same disc within the 4-CD set Encore Collection)	Composed in 1982, with lyrics by Alan and Marilyn Bergman, for solo vocal, chorus and orchestra
1984	Olympic Fanfare and Theme	1984-07-28	John Williams/Los Angeles Philharmonic – Los Angeles	1984	The Official Music of the 1984 Games /The Official Music of the XIII Olympiad (Vinyl only) (Original Recording) (John Williams/Los Angeles studio orchestra)	Composed for the 1984 Summer Olympic Games in Los Angeles
1984	Olympic Fanfare and Theme	1984-07-28	John Williams/Los Angeles Philharmonic – Los Angeles	1987	By Request... (John Williams/Boston Pops)	Composed for the 1984 Summer Olympic Games in Los Angeles
1984	Olympic Fanfare and Theme	1984-07-28	John Williams/Los Angeles Philharmonic – Los Angeles	1990	Pomp & Pizazz (Erich Kunzel/Cincinnati Pops O)	Composed for the 1984 Summer Olympic Games in Los Angeles
1984	Olympic Fanfare and Theme	1984-07-28	John Williams/Los Angeles Philharmonic – Los Angeles	1990	The Best Of John Williams (Philharmonic Rock O/Hayman)	Composed for the 1984 Summer Olympic Games in Los Angeles
1984	Olympic Fanfare and Theme	1984-07-28	John Williams/Los Angeles Philharmonic – Los Angeles	1996	Summon the Heroes (John Williams/Boston Pops) – includes Leo Arnaud's ‘Bugler's Dream’ Fanfare	Composed for the 1984 Summer Olympic Games in Los Angeles
1984	Olympic Fanfare and Theme	1984-07-28	John Williams/Los Angeles Philharmonic – Los Angeles	1998	World Anthems (Garcia, English Chamber O/Fraser)	Composed for the 1984 Summer Olympic Games in Los Angeles
1984	Olympic Fanfare and Theme	1984-07-28	John Williams/Los Angeles Philharmonic – Los Angeles	2002	The Dream Goes On (Ralph M. Gambone/United States Navy Band & Sea Chanters Chorus)	Composed for the 1984 Summer Olympic Games in Los Angeles
1984	Olympic Fanfare and Theme	1984-07-28	John Williams/Los Angeles Philharmonic – Los Angeles	2002	Canadian Scottish Regiment Pipes and Drums / Third Marine Aircraft Wing Band: Canadian Bagpipes and American Brass (United States Third Marine Aircraft Wing Band, Canadian Scottish Regiment Pipes and Drums)	Composed for the 1984 Summer Olympic Games in Los Angeles
1984	Olympic Fanfare and Theme	1984-07-28	John Williams/Los Angeles Philharmonic – Los Angeles	2004	Gomalan Brass Quintet	Composed for the 1984 Summer Olympic Games in Los Angeles
1984	Olympic Fanfare and Theme	1984-07-28	John Williams/Los Angeles Philharmonic – Los Angeles	2014	Center Stage (National S Winds/Graham)	Composed for the 1984 Summer Olympic Games in Los Angeles
1984	Olympic Fanfare and Theme	1984-07-28	John Williams/Los Angeles Philharmonic – Los Angeles	2015	A John Williams Celebration (Gustavo Dudamel/Los Angeles Philharmonic Orchestra) (DVD & Blu-ray)	Composed for the 1984 Summer Olympic Games in Los Angeles
1984	Olympic Fanfare and Theme	1984-07-28	John Williams/Los Angeles Philharmonic – Los Angeles	2016	Beecher Variations (Buffalo Silver Band, Bill Cocca)	Composed for the 1984 Summer Olympic Games in Los Angeles
1984	Olympic Fanfare and Theme	1984-07-28	John Williams/Los Angeles Philharmonic – Los Angeles	2018	John Williams: At The Movies (Dallas Winds, Jerry Junkin)	Composed for the 1984 Summer Olympic Games in Los Angeles
1984	Olympic Fanfare and Theme	1984-07-28	John Williams/Los Angeles Philharmonic – Los Angeles	2019	Celebrating John Williams (Los Angeles Philharmonic, Gustavo Dudamel) Live Recording	Composed for the 1984 Summer Olympic Games in Los Angeles
1985	Concerto for Tuba and Orchestra	1985-05-08	John Williams/Boston Pops – Chester Schimtz, Tuba – Boston	2002	20th Century Concerti (David Snell/Foundation Philharmonic)	Composed in 1985 for the Centennial of the Boston Pops
1985	Concerto for Tuba and Orchestra	1985-05-08	John Williams/Boston Pops – Chester Schimtz, Tuba – Boston	2004	New Music from Bowling Green, Vol. 3 (Emily Freeman Brown/Bowling Green Philharmonia)	Composed in 1985 for the Centennial of the Boston Pops
1985	Concerto for Tuba and Orchestra	1985-05-08	John Williams/Boston Pops – Chester Schimtz, Tuba – Boston	2005	Works for Bass Trombone (As 'Concerto for Bass Trombone' [Reworked Version]) (Charles Vernon, Bass trombone/Eric Ewazen, piano)	Composed in 1985 for the Centennial of the Boston Pops
1985	Concerto for Tuba and Orchestra	1985-05-08	John Williams/Boston Pops – Chester Schimtz, Tuba – Boston	2008	20th Century Tuba Concertos (Oysten Baadsvik/Singapore Symphony Orchestra)	Composed in 1985 for the Centennial of the Boston Pops
1985	Concerto for Tuba and Orchestra	1985-05-08	John Williams/Boston Pops – Chester Schimtz, Tuba – Boston	2014	On the Way: Works for Tuba (Andreas Martin Hofmeir/Münchner Philharmoniker/Andrew Manze)	Composed in 1985 for the Centennial of the Boston Pops
1985	Concerto for Tuba and Orchestra	1985-05-08	John Williams/Boston Pops – Chester Schimtz, Tuba – Boston	2016	Mr. Tuba (Setsuko Ohori, Shimpei Tsugita, Tomohiro Nishikubo, Eijiro Nakagawa, Susumu Ogino)	Composed in 1985 for the Centennial of the Boston Pops
1985	Concerto for Tuba and Orchestra	1985-05-08	John Williams/Boston Pops – Chester Schimtz, Tuba – Boston	2017	New York Philharmonic Orchestra - 175th Anniversary - 2016/2017 Season (Bray, Baer/New York Philh. O/Gilbert, Robertson)	Composed in 1985 for the Centennial of the Boston Pops
1985	Concerto for Tuba and Orchestra	1985-05-08	John Williams/Boston Pops – Chester Schimtz, Tuba – Boston	2019	Digital Release: John Williams Tuba Concerto - Single (Dennis Nulty, Tuba, Slatkin, Detroit Symphony Orchestra)	Composed in 1985 for the Centennial of the Boston Pops
1986	Liberty Fanfare	1986-07-04	John Williams/Boston Pops – New York City	1986	Hail To The Spirit Of Liberty ("The President's Own" United States Marine Band/Bourgeois)	Composed for the Centennial of the Statue of Liberty in 1986.
1986	Liberty Fanfare	1986-07-04	John Williams/Boston Pops – New York City	1987	By Request... (John Williams/Boston Pops)	Composed for the Centennial of the Statue of Liberty in 1986.
1986	Liberty Fanfare	1986-07-04	John Williams/Boston Pops – New York City	1987	United States Air Force Tactical Air Command Band: We The People (Welsh, United States Air Force Tactical Air Command Band/Graham)	Composed for the Centennial of the Statue of Liberty in 1986.
1986	Liberty Fanfare	1986-07-04	John Williams/Boston Pops – New York City	1988	American Jubilee (Erich Kunzel/Cincinnati Pops O)	Composed for the Centennial of the Statue of Liberty in 1986.
1986	Liberty Fanfare	1986-07-04	John Williams/Boston Pops – New York City	1989	Bridge Of Freedom: A commemoration Of The 40th Anniversary Of The Berlin Airlift 1949-1989 (Cronkie, The Band Of The United States Air Forces In Europe/Jessop)	Composed for the Centennial of the Statue of Liberty in 1986.
1986	Liberty Fanfare	1986-07-04	John Williams/Boston Pops – New York City	1989	United States Air Force Band and Singing Sergeants: The Last Full Measure of Devotion (United States Air Force Singing Sergeants, United States Air Force Band/Bonner)	Composed for the Centennial of the Statue of Liberty in 1986.
1986	Liberty Fanfare	1986-07-04	John Williams/Boston Pops – New York City	1990	The Best Of John Williams (Philharmonic Rock O/Hayman)	Composed for the Centennial of the Statue of Liberty in 1986.
1986	Liberty Fanfare	1986-07-04	John Williams/Boston Pops – New York City	1997	America, the Dream Goes on (Andrew Lane/Orlando Pops)	Composed for the Centennial of the Statue of Liberty in 1986.
1986	Liberty Fanfare	1986-07-04	John Williams/Boston Pops – New York City	1998	Victory At Sea (United States Navy Band)	Composed for the Centennial of the Statue of Liberty in 1986.
1986	Liberty Fanfare	1986-07-04	John Williams/Boston Pops – New York City	1999	A Splash Of Pops (Keith Lockhart/Boston Pops Orchestra)	Composed for the Centennial of the Statue of Liberty in 1986.
1986	Liberty Fanfare	1986-07-04	John Williams/Boston Pops – New York City	2001	A Patriotic Salute To The Military Family	Composed for the Centennial of the Statue of Liberty in 1986.
1986	Liberty Fanfare	1986-07-04	John Williams/Boston Pops – New York City	2001	London International Tattoo 2000 (Vladimir Yaskevich)	Composed for the Centennial of the Statue of Liberty in 1986.
1986	Liberty Fanfare	1986-07-04	John Williams/Boston Pops – New York City	2002	American Classics - An American Salute - Spirit Of The Nation	Composed for the Centennial of the Statue of Liberty in 1986.
1986	Liberty Fanfare	1986-07-04	John Williams/Boston Pops – New York City	2007	Liberty For All! (Lewis J. Buckley/United States Coast Guard Band)	Composed for the Centennial of the Statue of Liberty in 1986.
1986	Liberty Fanfare	1986-07-04	John Williams/Boston Pops – New York City	2008	(excerpt) Ceremonial Music 2 (United States Air Force Heritage Of America Band)	Composed for the Centennial of the Statue of Liberty in 1986.
1986	Liberty Fanfare	1986-07-04	John Williams/Boston Pops – New York City	2009	United States Navy Band: Showcase (United States Navy Band/Field)	Composed for the Centennial of the Statue of Liberty in 1986.
1986	Liberty Fanfare	1986-07-04	John Williams/Boston Pops – New York City	2010	2009 Midwest Clinic: Symphonic Wind Orchestra "la Armonica" (Frank De Vuyst)	Composed for the Centennial of the Statue of Liberty in 1986.
1986	Liberty Fanfare	1986-07-04	John Williams/Boston Pops – New York City	2012	John Williams: Greatest Hits (Evan Christ)	Composed for the Centennial of the Statue of Liberty in 1986.
1986	Liberty Fanfare	1986-07-04	John Williams/Boston Pops – New York City	2014	Winds of War and Peace (National S Winds/Graham)	Composed for the Centennial of the Statue of Liberty in 1986.
1986	Liberty Fanfare	1986-07-04	John Williams/Boston Pops – New York City	2014	2014 Florida Music Educators Association (FMEA): All-State Concert Band & All-State Symphonic Band (Florida All-State Women's Ch., Florida All-State Concert Band/Nix, Florida All-State S Band/Dunnigan)	Composed for the Centennial of the Statue of Liberty in 1986.
1986	Liberty Fanfare	1986-07-04	John Williams/Boston Pops – New York City	2016	2016 Illinois Music Educators Association (ILMEA): Honors Band & All-State Band [Live] (Illinois Honors Band, Illinois All-State Ch., Illinois Combined Honors Ens., Illinois All-State Band, Illinois Combined All-State Ens., Linda Moorhouse, John Bell)	Composed for the Centennial of the Statue of Liberty in 1986.
1986	Liberty Fanfare	1986-07-04	John Williams/Boston Pops – New York City	2017	2016 Midwest Clinic: Tokyo Geidai Wind Orchestra (Tokyo Geidai Wind Orchestra/Yamamoto); Arrangement for Wind Ensemble	Composed for the Centennial of the Statue of Liberty in 1986.
1987	We're Lookin' Good!	1987-05-05	John Williams/Boston Pops – Boston	1992	Quality Plus (P.R. Evans/The Band of the Corps of Royal Engineers)	Composed in 1987 for the Special Olympics, with lyrics by Alan and Marilyn Bergman
1987	We're Lookin' Good!	1987-05-05	John Williams/Boston Pops – Boston	2000	Esprit ("The Commandant’s Own" US Marine Drum & Bugle Corps); Arrangement for Drum and Bugle Corps.	Composed in 1987 for the Special Olympics, with lyrics by Alan and Marilyn Bergman
1987	A Hymn to New England	1987-05-05	John Williams/Boston Pops – Boston	1997	American Visions (Keith Lockhart/Boston Pops)	Composed in 1987 for the Omni Theatre, Boston
1987	A Hymn to New England	1987-05-05	John Williams/Boston Pops – Boston	2001	2000 Midwest Clinic (Charles T. Menghini/Vandercook College Of Music Symphonic Band)	Composed in 1987 for the Omni Theatre, Boston
1987	A Hymn to New England	1987-05-05	John Williams/Boston Pops – Boston	2002	American Journey (John Williams/Recording Arts Orchestra of Los Angeles)	Composed in 1987 for the Omni Theatre, Boston
1987	A Hymn to New England	1987-05-05	John Williams/Boston Pops – Boston	2006	John Williams: The Denver Brass (Kenneth Singleton/Denver Brass)	Composed in 1987 for the Omni Theatre, Boston
1987	A Hymn to New England	1987-05-05	John Williams/Boston Pops – Boston	2015	John Williams For Winds – Music for Cinema and Beyond (The United States Coast Guard Band, Captain Kenneth W. Megan) (Free Audio Streaming)	Composed in 1987 for the Omni Theatre, Boston
1987	A Hymn to New England	1987-05-05	John Williams/Boston Pops – Boston	2017	Journeys (The United States Air Force Band/Lang)	Composed in 1987 for the Omni Theatre, Boston
1988	For New York (To Lenny!, To Lenny!) (Variations on Themes by Leonard Bernstein)	1988	Tanglewood	2002	American Journey (John Williams/Recording Arts Orchestra of Los Angeles)	Composed in 1988 for Leonard Bernstein's 70th birthday celebrations in Tanglewood
1988	For New York (To Lenny!, To Lenny!) (Variations on Themes by Leonard Bernstein)	1988	Tanglewood	2018	Bernstein: Marin Alsop's Complete Naxos Recordings (São Paulo SO/Alsop)	Composed in 1988 for Leonard Bernstein's 70th birthday celebrations in Tanglewood
1988	For New York (To Lenny!, To Lenny!) (Variations on Themes by Leonard Bernstein)	1988	Tanglewood	2018	To Make Us Proud: A Leonard Bernstein Tribute (Fettig, Director / The President's Own United States Marine Band). Transcribed by Paul Lavender	Composed in 1988 for Leonard Bernstein's 70th birthday celebrations in Tanglewood
1988	Olympic Spirit (NBC Sports Theme)	1988		1988	The 1988 Summer Olympics Album – Original Recording	Commissioned by NBC for the Seoul Olympic games broadcast in 1988
1988	Olympic Spirit (NBC Sports Theme)	1988		1996	Summon the Heroes (John Williams/Boston Pops)	Commissioned by NBC for the Seoul Olympic games broadcast in 1988
1989	Winter Games Fanfare			2006	John Williams: The Denver Brass (Kenneth Singleton/Denver Brass)	Composed in 1989 for the Alpine Ski Championship, Vail, Colorado
1990	Celebrate Discovery	1990-07-04	John Williams/Boston Pops Esplanade Orchestra – Tanglewood	2002	American Journey (John Williams/Recording Arts Orchestra of Los Angeles)	Composed in 1990 for the 500th celebration of the arrival of Columbus to America
1991	Concerto for Clarinet and Orchestra	1991-04-13	John Williams/Riverside County Philharmonic – Michele Zukovsky, Clarinet – Los Angeles	2005	John Williams: Clarinet Concerto (John Williams/Los Angeles Philharmonic – Michele Zukovsky on clarinet, recorded in 1991); reissued for digital download in 2010, Michele Zukovsky.	Composed in 1991 for Michele Zukovsky, principal clarinet of the LA Philharmonic
1992	Fanfare for Prince Philip (Aloft... To the Royal Masthead)	1992-07-13	John Williams/Boston Pops	2011	Sound the Bells! – American Premières for Brass (Original Version for Brass and Percussion) (Alasdair Neale/The Bay Brass)	Composed in 1992 for the visit of Prince Philip to Boston, at the request of Boston Symphony Orchestra patron Frances Fahnstock
1993	Sound the Bells!	1993-06-10	John Williams/Boston Pops – Japan	2002	American Journey (John Williams/Recording Arts Orchestra of Los Angeles)	Composed on 1993 Memorial Day for brass and percussion, as a wedding gift to the Japanese princess Masako
1993	Sound the Bells!	1993-06-10	John Williams/Boston Pops – Japan	2011	Sound The Bells - A Holiday Celebration (United States Army Field Band)	Composed on 1993 Memorial Day for brass and percussion, as a wedding gift to the Japanese princess Masako
1993	Sound the Bells!	1993-06-10	John Williams/Boston Pops – Japan	2011	Sound the Bells! – American Premières for Brass (Original Version for Brass and Percussion) (Alasdair Neale/The Bay Brass)	Composed on 1993 Memorial Day for brass and percussion, as a wedding gift to the Japanese princess Masako
1993	Sound the Bells!	1993-06-10	John Williams/Boston Pops – Japan	2016	2016 Pennsylvania Music Educators Association (PMEA): All-State Wind Ensemble & All-State Concert Band [Live] (Pennsylvania All-State Wind Ens., Pennsylvania All-State Concert Band, Emily Threinen, Shannon Kitelinger)	Composed on 1993 Memorial Day for brass and percussion, as a wedding gift to the Japanese princess Masako
1993	Sound the Bells!	1993-06-10	John Williams/Boston Pops – Japan	2016	2016 Texas Music Educators Association (TMEA): Aledo High School Wind Ensemble (Live) (Aledo High School Wind Ens., Joey Paul, Jolette Wine, Keith Bearden, Olivia Ramirez, Jake Albin)	Composed on 1993 Memorial Day for brass and percussion, as a wedding gift to the Japanese princess Masako
1993	Concerto for Bassoon and Orchestra (The Five Sacred Trees)	1995-04-15	Kurt Masur/New York Philharmonic – Judith LeClair, bassoon	1997	John Williams: The Five Sacred Trees (John Williams/London Symphony – Judith LeClair, bassoon)	Composed in 1993 for the 150th celebration of the New York Philharmonic
1993	Concerto for Bassoon and Orchestra (The Five Sacred Trees)	1995-04-15	Kurt Masur/New York Philharmonic – Judith LeClair, bassoon	2015	Digital Release (Leonard Slatkin/Detroit Symphony – Robert Williams, bassoon)	Composed in 1993 for the 150th celebration of the New York Philharmonic
1994	Satellite Celebration (Song for World Peace), rev. 2002	1995-01-01	Seiji Ozawa/Saito Kinen – Isaac Stern, violin and Yo-Yo Ma, cello among others – Tokyo	2002	American Journey (John Williams/Recording Arts Orchestra of Los Angeles)	Composed in 1994 for the 1995 New Year's Day special broadcast, at the request of Seiji Ozawa
1994	Concerto for Cello and Orchestra	1994-07-07	John Williams/Boston Symphony Orchestra – Yo-Yo Ma, cello – Tanglewood	2002	Yo-Yo Ma Plays the Music of John Williams (John Williams/Recording Arts Orchestra of Los Angeles – Yo-Yo Ma, Cello)	Composed in 1994 for the opening of the Seiji Ozawa Hall in Tanglewood
1994	Concerto for Cello and Orchestra, rev. 2012	1994-07-07	John Williams/Boston Symphony Orchestra – Yo-Yo Ma, cello – Tanglewood	2015	Digital Release (Leonard Slatkin/Detroit Symphony – Robert DeMaine, Cello)	Composed in 1994 for the opening of the Seiji Ozawa Hall in Tanglewood
1995	Variations on Happy Birthday	1995-07-23	John Williams/Boston Symphony Orchestra – Tanglewood	2012	A Tribute to John Williams: An 80th Birthday Celebration (John Williams/Recording Arts Orchestra of Los Angeles)	Composed in 1995 to celebrate the birthdays of Yo-Yo Ma, Itzhak Perlman and Seiji Ozawa
1995	Summon the Heroes	1996-07-19	John Williams/Atlanta Symphony – Atlanta	1996	Summon the Heroes (John Williams/Boston Pops); Same recording on 'American Journey' (John Williams/Boston Pops), 2002.	Composed in 1995 for the Centennial Olympic Games in Atlanta, 1996. Dedicated to Tim Morrison, principal trumpeter of the Boston Symphony Orchestra.
1995	Summon the Heroes	1996-07-19	John Williams/Atlanta Symphony – Atlanta	2000	Waterloo (Capt. R. Wayne Hopla/The King's Division Waterloo Band)	Composed in 1995 for the Centennial Olympic Games in Atlanta, 1996. Dedicated to Tim Morrison, principal trumpeter of the Boston Symphony Orchestra.
1995	Summon the Heroes	1996-07-19	John Williams/Atlanta Symphony – Atlanta	2002	Summon The Heroes (Capt. J.R. Young/Royal Lancers Band)	Composed in 1995 for the Centennial Olympic Games in Atlanta, 1996. Dedicated to Tim Morrison, principal trumpeter of the Boston Symphony Orchestra.
1995	Summon the Heroes	1996-07-19	John Williams/Atlanta Symphony – Atlanta	2006	United States Air Force Band of Mid-America: Heroes, Lost and Fallen (United States Air Force Band of Mid-America/Pohl)	Composed in 1995 for the Centennial Olympic Games in Atlanta, 1996. Dedicated to Tim Morrison, principal trumpeter of the Boston Symphony Orchestra.
1995	Summon the Heroes	1996-07-19	John Williams/Atlanta Symphony – Atlanta	2008	Call To Duty (Finley R. Hamilton /United States Army Field Band & Soldiers' Chorus)	Composed in 1995 for the Centennial Olympic Games in Atlanta, 1996. Dedicated to Tim Morrison, principal trumpeter of the Boston Symphony Orchestra.
1995	Summon the Heroes	1996-07-19	John Williams/Atlanta Symphony – Atlanta	2008	From Sea To Shining Sea (Dana Rodgers, Charles Osgood, James Burchfiel, Timothy Morrison)	Composed in 1995 for the Centennial Olympic Games in Atlanta, 1996. Dedicated to Tim Morrison, principal trumpeter of the Boston Symphony Orchestra.
1995	Summon the Heroes	1996-07-19	John Williams/Atlanta Symphony – Atlanta	2010	Pershing's Own (United States Army Band "Pershing's Own")	Composed in 1995 for the Centennial Olympic Games in Atlanta, 1996. Dedicated to Tim Morrison, principal trumpeter of the Boston Symphony Orchestra.
1995	Summon the Heroes	1996-07-19	John Williams/Atlanta Symphony – Atlanta	2011	Strength Of The Nation (United States Army Field Band)	Composed in 1995 for the Centennial Olympic Games in Atlanta, 1996. Dedicated to Tim Morrison, principal trumpeter of the Boston Symphony Orchestra.
1995	Summon the Heroes	1996-07-19	John Williams/Atlanta Symphony – Atlanta	2011	Summon The Heroes (Band Of H.m. Royal Marines)	Composed in 1995 for the Centennial Olympic Games in Atlanta, 1996. Dedicated to Tim Morrison, principal trumpeter of the Boston Symphony Orchestra.
1995	Summon the Heroes	1996-07-19	John Williams/Atlanta Symphony – Atlanta	2011	Chimes Of Liberty (Truman W. Crawford/United States Marine Drum & Bugle Corps)	Composed in 1995 for the Centennial Olympic Games in Atlanta, 1996. Dedicated to Tim Morrison, principal trumpeter of the Boston Symphony Orchestra.
1995	Summon the Heroes	1996-07-19	John Williams/Atlanta Symphony – Atlanta	2012	United States Army Concert Band: Carnival (United States Army Concert Band/Shelburne Jr., Lamb)	Composed in 1995 for the Centennial Olympic Games in Atlanta, 1996. Dedicated to Tim Morrison, principal trumpeter of the Boston Symphony Orchestra.
1995	Summon the Heroes	1996-07-19	John Williams/Atlanta Symphony – Atlanta	2013	Take One (Vienna Brass Connection)	Composed in 1995 for the Centennial Olympic Games in Atlanta, 1996. Dedicated to Tim Morrison, principal trumpeter of the Boston Symphony Orchestra.
1995	Summon the Heroes	1996-07-19	John Williams/Atlanta Symphony – Atlanta	2015	John Williams For Winds – Music for Cinema and Beyond (The United States Coast Guard Band, Captain Kenneth W. Megan) (free audio streaming)	Composed in 1995 for the Centennial Olympic Games in Atlanta, 1996. Dedicated to Tim Morrison, principal trumpeter of the Boston Symphony Orchestra.
1996	Concerto for Trumpet and Orchestra	1996-10	Christoph von Dohnányi/Cleveland Orchestra – Michael Sachs on trumpet	2002	John Williams Trumpet Concerto featuring Arturo Sandoval recording (Ronald Feldman/London Symphony)	Composed in 1996 for Michael Sachs, first trumpet of the Cleveland Orchestra
1996	Concerto for Trumpet and Orchestra	1996-10	Christoph von Dohnányi/Cleveland Orchestra – Michael Sachs on trumpet	2013	Concertos for Trumpet and Orchestra (Jouko Harjanne/Finnish Radio Symphony Orchestra)	Composed in 1996 for Michael Sachs, first trumpet of the Cleveland Orchestra
1996	Concerto for Trumpet and Orchestra	1996-10	Christoph von Dohnányi/Cleveland Orchestra – Michael Sachs on trumpet	2017	2016 Midwest Clinic: "The President's Own" United States Marine Band – Concert One (United States Marine Band/Fettig, Foley, Colburn); Arrangement for Trumpet & Wind Ensemble	Composed in 1996 for Michael Sachs, first trumpet of the Cleveland Orchestra
1996	Concerto for Trumpet and Orchestra	1996-10	Christoph von Dohnányi/Cleveland Orchestra – Michael Sachs on trumpet	2019-03-08	Hooten Plays Williams (Thomas Hooten, principal trumpet Los Angeles Philharmonic / John Williams, Conductor / Members of the LA Phil and other LA musicians) - Kickstarter small album project including Born on the Fourth of July.	Composed in 1996 for Michael Sachs, first trumpet of the Cleveland Orchestra
1997	Elegy for Cello and Piano, rev. 2002	1997	Premiered by John Williams, piano and John Waltz, cello. Later arranged for cello and orchestra.	2002	Yo-Yo Ma Plays the Music of John Williams (Re-arrangement. Original arrangement unreleased) (John Williams/Recording Arts Orchestra of Los Angeles – Yo-Yo Ma, Cello)	Composed in 1997 for a memorial service in Los Angeles. Based on a secondary theme from Seven Years in Tibet.
1997	Elegy for Cello and Piano, rev. 2002	1997	Premiered by John Williams, piano and John Waltz, cello. Later arranged for cello and orchestra.	2013	We'll Paint You a Rainbow (Angeli Ensemble conducted by Michael Nowak, featuring Lynn Harrell on cello)	Composed in 1997 for a memorial service in Los Angeles. Based on a secondary theme from Seven Years in Tibet.
1999	American Journey (The Unfinished Journey – Celebration 2000)	1999-12-31	John Williams/Boston Symphony Orchestra – Tanglewood	2002	American Journey (John Williams/Recording Arts Orchestra of Los Angeles)	Originally composed as the score for the Steven Spielberg short documentary The Unfinished Journey. Subsequently, adapted as a concert work in 6 movements: ‘Immigration and Building’, ‘The Country at War’, ‘Popular Entertainment’, ‘Sports and Celebrities’, ‘Civil Rights and The Woman’s Movement’ and ‘Technology and Flight’.
1999	American Journey (The Unfinished Journey – Celebration 2000)	1999-12-31	John Williams/Boston Symphony Orchestra – Tanglewood	2010	Gardens Of Stone (United States Coast Guard Band)	Originally composed as the score for the Steven Spielberg short documentary The Unfinished Journey. Subsequently, adapted as a concert work in 6 movements: ‘Immigration and Building’, ‘The Country at War’, ‘Popular Entertainment’, ‘Sports and Celebrities’, ‘Civil Rights and The Woman’s Movement’ and ‘Technology and Flight’.
1999	American Journey (The Unfinished Journey – Celebration 2000)	1999-12-31	John Williams/Boston Symphony Orchestra – Tanglewood	2013	American Journeys (arr. for band by Paul Lavender, Kenneth W. Megan Jr./U.S. Coast Guard Band)	Originally composed as the score for the Steven Spielberg short documentary The Unfinished Journey. Subsequently, adapted as a concert work in 6 movements: ‘Immigration and Building’, ‘The Country at War’, ‘Popular Entertainment’, ‘Sports and Celebrities’, ‘Civil Rights and The Woman’s Movement’ and ‘Technology and Flight’.
1999	American Journey (The Unfinished Journey – Celebration 2000)	1999-12-31	John Williams/Boston Symphony Orchestra – Tanglewood	2016	(Excerpt) Midwest Clinic 2015: The U.S. Army Orchestra (Michael Ford (tenor), Manuel Bobenrieth (accordion), Terry Bingham (trumpet), United States Army O, Treg Ancelent, Anthony Maiello, Timothy J. Holtan)	Originally composed as the score for the Steven Spielberg short documentary The Unfinished Journey. Subsequently, adapted as a concert work in 6 movements: ‘Immigration and Building’, ‘The Country at War’, ‘Popular Entertainment’, ‘Sports and Celebrities’, ‘Civil Rights and The Woman’s Movement’ and ‘Technology and Flight’.
1999	American Journey (The Unfinished Journey – Celebration 2000)	1999-12-31	John Williams/Boston Symphony Orchestra – Tanglewood	2017	Journeys (The United States Air Force Band/Lang)	Originally composed as the score for the Steven Spielberg short documentary The Unfinished Journey. Subsequently, adapted as a concert work in 6 movements: ‘Immigration and Building’, ‘The Country at War’, ‘Popular Entertainment’, ‘Sports and Celebrities’, ‘Civil Rights and The Woman’s Movement’ and ‘Technology and Flight’.
2000	Three Pieces for Solo Cello	2002-08-04	John Williams/Boston Symphony Orchestra – Tanglewood	2002	Yo-Yo Ma Plays the Music of John Williams (John Williams/Recording Arts Orchestra of Los Angeles – Yo-Yo Ma, cello)	Composed in 2000 for Yo-Yo Ma
2000	Three Pieces for Solo Cello	2002-08-04	John Williams/Boston Symphony Orchestra – Tanglewood	2013	Composing Without The Picture (Richard Harwood, solo cello; digital release)	Composed in 2000 for Yo-Yo Ma
2000	TreeSong for Violin and Orchestra	2000-07-08	John Williams/Boston Symphony Orchestra – Gil Shaham, violin	2001	Treesong (John Williams/Boston Symphony Orchestra – Gil Shaham on Violin)	Composed in 2000 for Gil Shaham
2001	Heartwood: Lyric Sketches for Cello and Orchestra	2002-08-04	John Williams/Boston Symphony Orchestra – Yo-Yo Ma, cello – Boston	2002	Yo-Yo Ma Plays the Music of John Williams (John Williams/Recording Arts Orchestra of Los Angeles – Yo-Yo Ma, cello)	Composed in 2001 for Yo-Yo Ma
2001	Call of the Champions	2002-02-08	John Williams/Utah Symphony and Mormon Tabernacle Choir – Salt Lake City	2002	American Journey (John Williams/Recording Arts Orchestra of Los Angeles)	Composed in late 2001 for the Salt Lake City winter Olympic Games of 2002
2001	Call of the Champions	2002-02-08	John Williams/Utah Symphony and Mormon Tabernacle Choir – Salt Lake City	2003	Encore Collection - The Many Sounds Of The Mormon Tabernacle Choir (Craig Jessop) (Also available on the standalone album Spirit of America, which is the same disc within the 4-CD set Encore Collection)	Composed in late 2001 for the Salt Lake City winter Olympic Games of 2002
2001	Call of the Champions	2002-02-08	John Williams/Utah Symphony and Mormon Tabernacle Choir – Salt Lake City	2015	Air Force Blue (Larry H. Lang/United States Air Force Band, United States Air Force Singing Sergeants)	Composed in late 2001 for the Salt Lake City winter Olympic Games of 2002
2002	Escapades, concerto for alto saxophone & orchestra			2009	American Spectrum (Branford Marsalis and the North Carolina Symphony Orchestra conducted by Grant Llewellyn)	Originally composed as the score for the Steven Spielberg movie Catch Me If you Can. Subsequently, adapted as a concert work in 3 movements: 'Closing In', 'Reflections', 'Joy Ride'.
2002	Escapades, concerto for alto saxophone & orchestra			2011	Our Musical Legacy (USAF Band of the Golden West/Bland, Martin)	Originally composed as the score for the Steven Spielberg movie Catch Me If you Can. Subsequently, adapted as a concert work in 3 movements: 'Closing In', 'Reflections', 'Joy Ride'.
2002	Escapades, concerto for alto saxophone & orchestra			2013	Intrinsic Versatility (Miles Osland, Clarinet; Miles Osland, Flute; Vince DiMartino, Flugelhorn; Vince DiMartino, Trumpet); Raleigh Dailey, Piano; Miles Osland, Saxophone) (arr. for small band).	Originally composed as the score for the Steven Spielberg movie Catch Me If you Can. Subsequently, adapted as a concert work in 3 movements: 'Closing In', 'Reflections', 'Joy Ride'.
2002	Escapades, concerto for alto saxophone & orchestra			2015	John Williams For Winds – Music for Cinema and Beyond (The United States Coast Guard Band, Captain Kenneth W. Megan) (Free Audio Streaming)	Originally composed as the score for the Steven Spielberg movie Catch Me If you Can. Subsequently, adapted as a concert work in 3 movements: 'Closing In', 'Reflections', 'Joy Ride'.
2002	Escapades, concerto for alto saxophone & orchestra			2013	Catch Me If You Can (Amy Dickson, Saxophone)	Originally composed as the score for the Steven Spielberg movie Catch Me If you Can. Subsequently, adapted as a concert work in 3 movements: 'Closing In', 'Reflections', 'Joy Ride'.
2002	Escapades, concerto for alto saxophone & orchestra			2013	Escapades (Jan Schulte-Bunert, Saxophone)	Originally composed as the score for the Steven Spielberg movie Catch Me If you Can. Subsequently, adapted as a concert work in 3 movements: 'Closing In', 'Reflections', 'Joy Ride'.
2002	Escapades, concerto for alto saxophone & orchestra			2015	A John Williams Celebration (Gustavo Dudamel/Los Angeles Philharmonic Orchestra) (DVD & Blu-ray)	Originally composed as the score for the Steven Spielberg movie Catch Me If you Can. Subsequently, adapted as a concert work in 3 movements: 'Closing In', 'Reflections', 'Joy Ride'.
2002	Escapades, concerto for alto saxophone & orchestra			2017	The Spielberg/Williams Collaboration Part III (John Williams/Recording Arts O of LA)	Originally composed as the score for the Steven Spielberg movie Catch Me If you Can. Subsequently, adapted as a concert work in 3 movements: 'Closing In', 'Reflections', 'Joy Ride'.
2003	Soundings	2003-10-25	John Williams/Los Angeles Philharmonic	2015	A John Williams Celebration (Gustavo Dudamel/Los Angeles Philharmonic Orchestra; Itzhak Perlman, violin) (DVD & Blu-ray)	Composed for the Walt Disney Concert Hall
2003	Concerto for Horn and Orchestra	2003-11-29	John Williams/Chicago Symphony Orchestra – Dale Clevenger, Horn – Chicago	2010	Digital Release (Leonard Slatkin/Detroit Symphony – Karl Pituch, Horn)	Composed for the Chicago Symphony Orchestra's principal horn Dale Clevenger
2003	Concerto for Horn and Orchestra	2003-11-29	John Williams/Chicago Symphony Orchestra – Dale Clevenger, Horn – Chicago	2019-03-17	Williams Horn Concerto - Piano reduction on album From Screen to Concert Hall: Solo and Chamber Works for Horn (Daffyd Bevil, Horn / Satoko Hayami, Piano)	Composed for the Chicago Symphony Orchestra's principal horn Dale Clevenger
2007	Duo Concertante for Violin and Viola	2007-08-17	John Williams/Boston Pops – Victor Romanul, Violin – Michael Zaretsky, Viola – Tanglewood	2008	Duos for Violin and Viola (Victor Romanul / Michael Zaretsky)	Composed for Michael Zaretsky
2007?	Violin Fantasy on Fiddler on the Roof (Cadenza and Variations)			2013	Violin Showcase (Matthieu Arama, violin / Aurelien Pontier, piano)	
2007?	Violin Fantasy on Fiddler on the Roof (Cadenza and Variations)			2015	A John Williams Celebration (Gustavo Dudamel/Los Angeles Philharmonic Orchestra; Itzhak Perlman, violin) (DVD & Blu-ray)	
2007?	Violin Fantasy on Fiddler on the Roof (Cadenza and Variations)			2016	Fiddler On The Roof [2016 Broadway Cast] (performed by Itzhak Perlman, directed by Ted Sperling)	
2009	Air and Simple Gifts	2009-01-20	Yo-Yo Ma, Cello – Itzhak Perlman, Violin – Gabriela Montero, Piano – Anthony McGill, Clarinet – Washington, DC	2009	John Williams: Air and Simple Gifts / Ma, McGill, Montero, Perlman; iTunes release	Composed for Barack Obama's Inaugural Ceremony
2009	On Willows and Birches (Concerto for Harp and Orchestra)	2009-09-23	John Williams/Boston Symphony Orchestra – Boston	2011	Digital Release (Shi-Yeon Sung/Boston Symphony Orchestra - Ann Hobson Pilot, Harp)	Composed for Ann Hobson Pilot
2009	Stargazers, for harp and orchestra	2009-07-18	John Williams/Boston Symphony Orchestra – Ann Hobson Pilot, harp – Tanglewood	2017	Lights, Camera...Music! Six Decades of John Williams (Keith Lockhart/Boston Pops)	Concert work for harp and orchestra inspired by the piece "E.T. and me" from E.T. The Extra-Terrestrial
2011	Concerto for Oboe and Orchestra	2011-05-25	John Williams/Boston Pops – Keisuke Wakao, Oboe – Boston	2013	Digital Release (John Williams/Boston Pops)	Composed for Keisuke Wakao
2012	Fanfare for Fenway	2012-04-20	John Williams/Boston Pops – Fenway Park in Boston	2013	2012 Midwest Clinic: The United States Air Force Band Chamber Ensembles	Composed in celebration of the 100th anniversary of Fenway Park.
2012	Fanfare for Fenway	2012-04-20	John Williams/Boston Pops – Fenway Park in Boston	2015	John Williams For Winds – Music for Cinema and Beyond (The United States Coast Guard Band, Captain Kenneth W. Megan) (Free Audio Streaming)	Composed in celebration of the 100th anniversary of Fenway Park.
2012	Fanfare for Fenway	2012-04-20	John Williams/Boston Pops – Fenway Park in Boston	2017	Everything Beautiful (Anne Bither Reynolds, DePauw University Band, Craig Paré)	Composed in celebration of the 100th anniversary of Fenway Park.
2012	Rounds	2012-06-02	Pablo Sáinz Villegas - Parkening International Guitar Competition in Malibu (California)	2015	Americano (Pablo Villegas, guitar)	Dedicated "with great admiration for Christopher Parkening and the Parkening International Guitar Competition".
2012	Rounds	2012-06-02	Pablo Sáinz Villegas - Parkening International Guitar Competition in Malibu (California)	2016	Meng (Meng Su, guitar).	Dedicated "with great admiration for Christopher Parkening and the Parkening International Guitar Competition".
2012	Rounds	2012-06-02	Pablo Sáinz Villegas - Parkening International Guitar Competition in Malibu (California)	2016	Rovshan Mamedkuliev – Guitar Recital.	Dedicated "with great admiration for Christopher Parkening and the Parkening International Guitar Competition".
2013	Fanfare "For the President's Own"	2013-05-26	Wolf Trap National Park for the Performing Arts in Fairfax County, Virginia (Michael J. Colburn/United States Marine Band)	2014	Be Glad Then, America (United States Marine Band)	Composed for the 215th anniversary of the United States Marine Band.
2013	Fanfare "For the President's Own"	2013-05-26	Wolf Trap National Park for the Performing Arts in Fairfax County, Virginia (Michael J. Colburn/United States Marine Band)	2016	American Voices (The US Air Force Concert Band)	Composed for the 215th anniversary of the United States Marine Band.
2013	Fanfare "For the President's Own"	2013-05-26	Wolf Trap National Park for the Performing Arts in Fairfax County, Virginia (Michael J. Colburn/United States Marine Band)	2017	Inventions (North Texas Wind Symphony/Corporon)	Composed for the 215th anniversary of the United States Marine Band.
2013	Fanfare "For the President's Own"	2013-05-26	Wolf Trap National Park for the Performing Arts in Fairfax County, Virginia (Michael J. Colburn/United States Marine Band)	2017	2016 Midwest Clinic: "The President's Own" United States Marine Band – Concert One (United States Marine Band/Fettig, Foley, Colburn)	Composed for the 215th anniversary of the United States Marine Band.
2013	Fanfare "For the President's Own"	2013-05-26	Wolf Trap National Park for the Performing Arts in Fairfax County, Virginia (Michael J. Colburn/United States Marine Band)	2017	2017 Texas Music Educators Association (TMEA): University of Texas at Arlington Wind Symphony (University of Texas Arlington Wind Symphony/Stotter, Evans)	Composed for the 215th anniversary of the United States Marine Band.
2013	Conversations	2012-08-10	First two movements premiered by Gloria Cheng on August 10, 2012 in Tanglewood. Third and Fourth movements premiered by Gloria Cheng on November 12, 2013 in Los Angeles.	2015	Montage - Great Film Composers And The Piano (Gloria Cheng)	Composed for Gloria Cheng
2014	Music for Brass	2014-06-12	National Brass Ensemble, Sonoma County.	2015	Gabrieli: National Brass Ensemble	Composed for the National Brass Ensemble
2014	Music for Brass	2014-06-12	National Brass Ensemble, Sonoma County.	2016	2016 Midwest Clinic: The 'President's Own' United States Marine Band Chamber Ensembles (Lt. Col. Jason Fettig, Director)	Composed for the National Brass Ensemble
2014	Scherzo for Piano and Orchestra	2014-07-01	Premiered by Long Yu and the China Philharmonic Orchestra, with Lang Lang, piano	2014		
2015	"Markings" for solo violin, strings and harp	2017-07-16	Premiered by Andris Nelsons and the Boston Symphony with Anne-Sophie Mutter, violin	2019	Across The Stars - Deluxe Edition (Mutter, Recording Arts Orchestra of Los Angeles/Williams)	Composed for Anne-Sophie Mutter
2018	Highwood's Ghost, An Encounter for Cello, Harp and Orchestra	2018-08-19	Premiered by Andris Nelsons and the Tanglewood Music Center Orchestra; John Williams led the Boston Symphony Orchestra (with other orchestra members from around the world) the week after. Jessica Zhou and Yo-Yo Ma performed at both concerts.	2018	Bernstein at 100 - The Centennial Celebration at Tanglewood Blu-ray and DVD release. John Williams, conductor.	Composed to celebrate Leonard Bernstein's 100th birthday for Jessica Zhou, Harp, and Yo-Yo Ma, Cello

=== Selective discography of his works recorded by others ===
- 1962 Themes To Remember - Top TV Themes And Background Music. Stanley Wilson, Decca
- 1962 Checkmate: Shelly Manne & His Men Play the Music of Johnny Williams from the TV Series. Arranged by John Williams (Reissued in 2002, Contemporary Records; Reissued in 2014 with Bonus Tracks, Jazz Musts)
- 1962 The Theme From Ben Casey and the Top TV Themes From.... Valjean at the piano with orchestral accompaniment
- 1965 André Previn Plays Music Of The Young Hollywood Composers. RCA Victor
- 1972 Walter Matthau sings the love theme from 'Pete 'n' Tillie'. MCA Records
- 1973 Frank Sinatra – Ol' Blue Eyes Is Back. Reprise Records
- 1976 A Concert of Film Music. London Symphony Orchestra/Henry Mancini
- 1977 Music Inspired By Star Wars And Other Galactic Funk. Meco, Millennium (Reissued in 1999, Hip-O Records)
- 1978 Cinema Gala: Star Wars/Close Encounters of the Third Kind. Los Angeles Philharmonic Orchestra/Zubin Mehta
- 1978 John Williams: Close Encounters of the Third Kind/Star Wars. National Philharmonic Orchestra/Charles Gerhardt
- 1979 Digital Space. London Symphony Orchestra/Morton Gould (Reissued in 1985, Varèse Sarabande; Reissued in 2007 with previously unreleased material Morton Gould Conducts Film Score Classics And Rarities, Citadel Records)
- 1980 John Williams: The Empire Strikes Back. National Philharmonic Orchestra/Charles Gerhardt
- 1982 Flying (Theme from E.T.). London Symphony Orchestra/John Bell, Towerbell Records/UK SP
- 1983 John Williams: Return of the Jedi. National Philharmonic Orchestra/Charles Gerhardt
- 1983 John Williams: The Star Wars Trilogy. Utah Symphony Orchestra/Varujan Kojian (reissued for digital download in 2013, Varèse Sarabande)
- 1984 Star Tracks. Cincinnati Pops Orchestra/Erich Kunzel
- 1984 Time Warp. Cincinnati Pops Orchestra/Erich Kunzel
- 1985 The Final Frontier - The Triple Album. London Symphony Orchestra/Roy Budd (Reissued in 1995 "Big Screen Adventures"; reissued for digital download in 2014 "Film Classics, Vol. 1", Collins Classics)
- 1987 Hollywood’s Greatest Hits, Vol. I. Cincinnati Pops Orchestra/Erich Kunzel
- 1987 Star Tracks II. Cincinnati Pops Orchestra/Erich Kunzel
- 1989 Music From the Prince and the Pauper [and other film music]. National Philharmonic Orchestra/Charles Gerhardt
- 1989 Classic Marches. Saint Louis Symphony Orchestra/Leonard Slatkin
- 1990 Fantastic Journey. Cincinnati Pops Orchestra/Erich Kunzel
- 1990 The Best Of John Williams, Philharmonic Rock Orchestra/Richard Hayman
- 1991 Movie Love Themes. Cincinnati Pops Orchestra/Erich Kunzel
- 1994 The Great Fantasy Adventure Album. Cincinnati Pops Orchestra/Erich Kunzel
- 1995 Journey To The Stars: A Sci Fi Fantasy Adventure. Hollywood Bowl Orchestra/John Mauceri
- 1997 Beautiful Hollywood. Cincinnati Pops Orchestra/Erich Kunzel
- 1998 Midway. Royal Scottish National Orchestra/Rick Kentworth (reissued for digital download in 2014, Varèse Sarabande)
- 1998 Superman: The Movie. Royal Scottish National Orchestra/John Debney (reissued for digital download in 2014, Varèse Sarabande)
- 1998 Hollywood Nightmares. Hollywood Bowl Orchestra/John Mauceri
- 1998 Holiday Pops. Boston Pops Orchestra/Keith Lockhart
- 1998 Gustav Holst: The Planets; John Williams: Star Wars Suite; Richard Strauss: Also sprach Zarathustra . Los Angeles Philharmonic Orchestra/Zubin Mehta, compilation (reissued partially in 2012, Decca)
- 1999 Themes from The Phantom Menace and Other Film Hits. Royal Scottish National Orchestra/Frederic Talgorn
- 1999 Amazing Stories. Royal Scottish National Orchestra/Joel McNeely, John Debney
- 1999 The Great Movie Scores from the Films of Steven Spielberg. Cincinnati Pops Orchestra/Erich Kunzel
- 2000 Jaws. Royal Scottish National Orchestra/Joel McNeely (reissued for digital download in 2014, Varèse Sarabande)
- 2000 Dallas Christmas Gala. Dallas SO & Chorus/Andrew Litton, David R. Davidson
- 2000 Devil's Dance. Gil Shaham & Jonathan Feldman
- 2000 Great Orchestral Marches. Edmonton Symphony Orchestra/Uri Mayer
- 2000 Hollywood Symphonic Concert - John Williams. Kanagawa Philharmonic Orchestra/Orie Suzuki
- 2000 Mega Movies. Cincinnati Pops Orchestra/Erich Kunzel
- 2001 Greatest Science Fiction Hits IV. Neil Norman And His Cosmic Orchestra
- 2003 John Williams: 40 Years of Film Music. City of Prague Philharmonic (2-CD set, compilation)
- 2003 Epics. Cincinnati Pops Orchestra/Erich Kunzel
- 2005 Kreisler, Paganini, Sarasate, Wieniawski. Maxim Vengerov
- 2005 Music from the Films of Steven Spielberg. City of Prague Philharmonic (2-CD set, compilation)
- 2006 Great Film Fantasies. Cincinnati Pops Orchestra/Erich Kunzel
- 2007 Movie Legends John Williams. Royal Philharmonic Orchestra
- 2007 Symphonic Brass. The Black Dyke Mills Band/Nicholas J. Childs
- 2008 The Six Star Wars Films. City of Prague Philharmonic
- 2009 Filmharmonic. Royal Philharmonic Orchestra (3-CD set)
- 2009 A Family Christmas. Royal Scottish National Orchestra & Junior Chorus/Christopher Bell
- 2009 The Hollywood Flute of Louise Di Tullio. Sinfonia Toronto/Ronald Royer
- 2009 Alexandre Da Costa: Schindler's List. Bienne Symphonic Orchestra/Thomas Rösner
- 2010 Moviebrass - West Side Story Suite, Space Brass. Gomalan Brass Quintet
- 2010 Schönbrunn 2010 - Moon, Planets, Stars. Vienna Philharmonic Orchestra/Franz Welser-Möst
- 2011 Portals. St. Petersburg Symphony Orchestra/Vladimir Lande
- 2012 The Complete Harry Potter Film Music Collection. City of Prague Philharmonic (2-CD set)
- 2012 The Music of John Williams: The Definitive Collection. City of Prague Philharmonic (6-CD set, compilation)
- 2012 Barber, Korngold: Violin Concertos. Alexander Gilman
- 2012 John Williams Greatest Hits. Philharmonisches Orchester of Staatstheater Cottbus/Evan Christ
- 2012 Silence on joue!/A Time for Us. Angèle Dubeau & La Pietà
- 2013 La Creation Du Monde. Swedish Wind Ensemble/Christian Lindberg
- 2013 300. Ingolf Wunder.
- 2013 American Harp. Yolanda Kondonassis
- 2013 The Silver Violin. Nicola Benedetti
- 2013 Violin Showcase, Matthieu Arama
- 2013 Nigunim: Hebrew Melodies. Gil Shaham, Orla Shaham.
- 2013 My First Decade. Nicola Benedetti.
- 2014 Eventide. Voces8.
- 2014 Escape to Paradise. Daniel Hope, TodtenhaupAmmon, Sting/Royal Stockholm Philh. O, Quintet of the Kammerorchester Berlin/Shelley.
- 2015 Music from The Star Wars Saga. City of Prague Philharmonic (Selections from the 2012 compilation The Definitive Collection)
- 2015 Schindler's List: The Film Music of John Williams. Elizabeth Hedman, Dan Redfeld
- 2015 Hollywood Blockbusters, Vol. 2. Royal Philharmonic Orchestra/Nic Raine
- 2015 Waldbühne 2015. Berliner Philharmoniker/Simon Rattle
- 2015 Sixty-Eight Annual Midwest Clinic 2014. Carmel High School Symphony Orchestra/Soo Han, Margaret Hite, Elisabeth Ohly-Davis, Dr. Robert Gillespie, Michael Pote
- 2015 On A Lighter Note. Frikki Walker.
- 2015 Journey East. Nemanja Radulovic.
- 2016 Silence on joue: Take 2. Angèle Dubeau & La Pietà
- 2017 Lights, Camera...Music! Six Decades of John Williams. Boston Pops Orchestra/Keith Lockhart
- 2017 Sommernachtskonzert (Summer Night Concert) 2017. Vienna Philharmonic Orchestra/Christoph Eschenbach.
- 2017 John Williams: Themes and Transcriptions for Piano. Co-arranged by John Williams and Simone Pedroni. Simone Pedroni, piano.
- 2018 John Williams: A Life in Music. London Symphony Orchestra/Gavin Greenaway.
- 2018 The Genius of Film Music - Hollywood 1980s-2000s. London Symphony Orchestra/Dirk Brossé.
- 2019 Celebrating John Williams. Los Angeles Philharmonic/Gustavo Dudamel (2 CD Set)

== See also ==
- List of compositions by John Williams
- Star Wars music
- Superman music
- Harry Potter music
