= Music of the Harry Potter films =

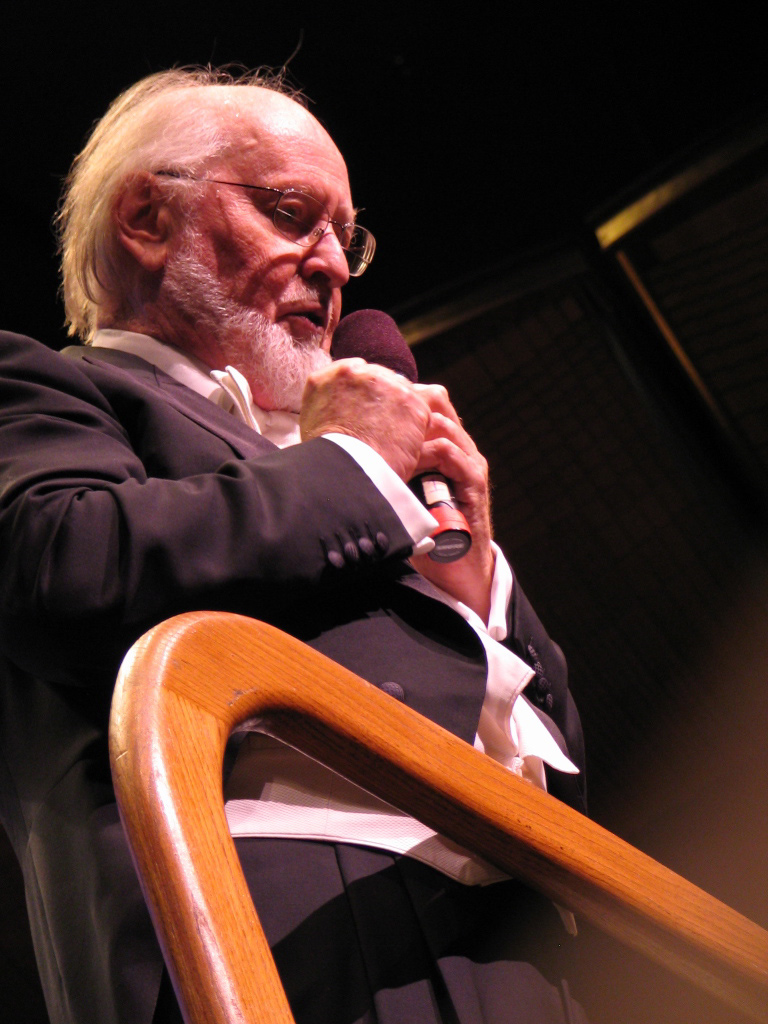
John Williams, composer of the first three films and creator of "Hedwig's Theme".

The music of the Harry Potter film series was recorded and released in conjunction with the post-production and releases of each of the eight corresponding films. The scores were composed by John Williams, Patrick Doyle, Nicholas Hooper, and Alexandre Desplat. Though Williams only scored the first three films, several motifs that he created have been reprised and incorporated into the remaining scores, in particular "Hedwig's Theme", which can be heard in all eight films. Other musicians credited with writing the Harry Potter music include Jarvis Cocker, The Ordinary Boys, and Nick Cave and the Bad Seeds. Jeremy Soule and James Hannigan wrote the music for the Harry Potter video games. J. Scott Rakozy, Peter Murray, and Chuck E. Myers "Sea" composed the music for Hogwarts Legacy.

== Overview ==
Year	Title	Composer	Conductor	Orchestrator	Orchestra
2001	Harry Potter and the Philosopher's Stone	John Williams	John Williams	John Williams; Conrad Pope; Alexander Courage; John Neufeld; Eddie Karam; Pete Anthony; Larry Rench	London Session Orchestra
2002	Harry Potter and the Chamber of Secrets	John Williams	William Ross	Conrad Pope; Eddie Karam; Pete Anthony	London Symphony Orchestra
2004	Harry Potter and the Prisoner of Azkaban	John Williams	John Williams	Conrad Pope; Eddie Karam	London Session Orchestra
2005	Harry Potter and the Goblet of Fire	Patrick Doyle	James Shearman	Patrick Doyle; James Shearman; Lawrence Ashmore; John Bell; Brad Dechter; Nicole Nevin; James McWilliam	London Symphony Orchestra
2007	Harry Potter and the Order of the Phoenix	Nicholas Hooper	Alastair King Nicholas Hooper	Alastair King; Simon Whiteside; Geoff Alexander; Julian Kershaw; Bradley Miles	Chamber Orchestra of London
2009	Harry Potter and the Half-Blood Prince	Nicholas Hooper	Nicholas Hooper; Alastair King	Alastair King; Jeff Atmajian; Simon Whiteside; Daryl Griffith; Bradley Farmer	Chamber Orchestra of London
2010	Harry Potter and the Deathly Hallows – Part 1	Alexandre Desplat		Alexandre Desplat; Conrad Pope; Jean-Pascal Beintus; Clifford Tasner; Richard Stewart; Nan Schwartz; Alejandro de la Llosa	London Symphony Orchestra
2011	Harry Potter and the Deathly Hallows – Part 2	Alexandre Desplat		Alexandre Desplat; Conrad Pope; Jean-Pascal Beintus; Clifford Tasner; Bill Newlin; Nan Schwartz; Alejandro de la Llosa	London Symphony Orchestra

== Themes and motifs ==
Throughout the series, each composer created themes for particular characters, items, locations, and ideas. Several themes can be heard in films subsequent to the one they were written for, although very few lasted for the entire film series.

=== First appearance in The Philosopher's Stone ===
Theme	Description	Scores heard in
Hedwig's Theme	The dominant theme closely identified with and prominently used in all eight Harry Potter films. Though titled "Hedwig's Theme", it does not always specifically represent Hedwig, but rather the wider idea of magic and the Wizarding World franchise. Its concert suite is frequently performed by musicians and ensembles.	The Philosopher's Stone, Chamber of Secrets, Prisoner of Azkaban, Goblet of Fire, Order of the Phoenix, Half-Blood Prince, Deathly Hallows – Part 1 and Deathly Hallows – Part 2
Family Portrait	Represents Harry's parents and his new family in Hogwarts.	The Philosopher's Stone, The Chamber of Secrets, and The Deathly Hallows – Part 2 (Tracked)
Harry's Wondrous World	Associated with Harry and his friendships with Ron and Hermione.	The Philosopher's Stone, The Chamber of Secrets, The Half-Blood Prince (recording sessions only) and The Deathly Hallows – Part 2 (Tracked)
Nimbus 2000	Associated with the Nimbus 2000, flying, and mischief.	The Philosopher's Stone, The Chamber of Secrets, The Prisoner of Azkaban and The Deathly Hallows – Part 2
Voldemort's Theme	A two-part theme associated with the main antagonist, Lord Voldemort	The Philosopher's Stone and The Chamber of Secrets
Philosopher's Stone	Associated with the Philosopher's Stone and used to represent Voldemort in The Chamber of Secrets.	The Philosopher's Stone and The Chamber of Secrets
Diagon Alley	Represents Diagon Alley as a setting.	The Philosopher's Stone (album only) and The Chamber of Secrets
Hogwarts Forever	A thematic representation of Hogwarts	The Philosopher's Stone
Quidditch Fanfare	Represents the commencement of quidditch matches.	The Philosopher's Stone and The Chamber of Secrets
Christmas at Hogwarts	Associated with the arrival of winter and Christmas.	The Philosopher's Stone and The Chamber of Secrets
The Dark Forest	Represents the Dark Forest as a setting.	The Philosopher's Stone and The Chamber of Secrets
The Flying Keys	Represents flying magical objects and creatures; such as the flying keys in the first film, and Cornish Pixies and the bludger in the second film.	The Philosopher's Stone and The Chamber of Secrets
The Banquet Fanfare	Music used during banquet scenes.	The Philosopher's Stone and The Chamber of Secrets
The Great Hall Fanfare	Theme associated with the discovery of the amazing wizarding world. Used for the discoveries of Diagon Alley (in the movie), Hogwarts and the Great Hall (and during the sorting of Hermione).	The Philosopher's Stone
Ron Weasley's Motif	Whimsical theme used to represent the lightness of Ron.	The Philosopher's Stone and The Chamber of Secrets
Weasley's Family	Comical theme heard during family scenes, notably the train station scenes.	The Philosopher's Stone and The Chamber of Secrets
Comical Theme	Used for Hagrid's dragon and Ron's eat slugs curse.	The Philosopher's Stone and The Chamber of Secrets
Revelation Theme	Used with the first appearance of the Chessboard Chamber and the Chamber of Secrets. First heard when Filch and Snape discover that someone was in the restricted library in the first movie.	The Philosopher's Stone and The Chamber of Secrets
The Sneaking Around Theme	Heard with the first appearance of Dumbledore out of the mist; the Golden Trio visiting Hagrid in the middle of the night; the approach of the flying car; and Harry finding Nearly Headless Nick & Justin Finch-Fletchley petrified.	The Philosopher's Stone and The Chamber of Secrets
Dursley's Theme	Comical theme associated with the Dursleys.	The Philosopher's Stone and The Chamber of Secrets
Ghosts' Motif	Music heard when the ghosts appear. Also used in Moaning Myrtle's theme.	The Philosopher's Stone and The Chamber of Secrets
Invisibility Cloak Theme	Associated with the cloak during its use in the first two films. Also used when Harry is writing to Tom Riddle in the diary, and when Tom starts explaining to Harry the strange events that happened during school year in the second film. Heard very briefly in the third film when Harry puts on the cloak in the Honeydukes cellar.	The Philosopher's Stone, The Chamber of Secrets and The Prisoner of Azkaban
Fluffy's Harp	Music played by the harp in the first film, which was the instrument used to put Fluffy to sleep.	The Philosopher's Stone
Leaving Hogwarts	Music played when Harry gets on the train.	The Philosopher's Stone, The Chamber of Secrets and The Deathly Hallows – Part 2

=== First appearance in The Chamber of Secrets ===
Theme	Description	Scores Heard in
Fawkes the Phoenix	Associated with Dumbledore's pet Phoenix.	The Chamber of Secrets
Gilderoy Lockhart	Represents Flourish & Blotts and the eponymous professor.	The Chamber of Secrets
Dobby's Theme	Represents Dobby the House Elf.	The Chamber of Secrets
The Chamber of Secrets	Associated with the Chamber of Secrets as a setting.	The Chamber of Secrets
Moaning Myrtle	Associated with Moaning Myrtle.	The Chamber of Secrets
The Flying Car	Represents the enchanted car used by the protagonists.	The Chamber of Secrets
Spider's Theme	Eight notes theme (one for each leg) associated with Aragog's spiders. A similar theme is heard in Munich (2005), which Williams was already scheduled for and had potentially started to develop.	The Chamber of Secrets
Lucius Malfoy's Theme	Conspiracy theme associated with Malfoy. It is based on a similar theme heard in Star Wars: Attack of the Clones.	The Chamber of Secrets
Errol the Owl	Associated with the pet owl of the Weasley family.	The Chamber of Secrets
Basilisk Duel Motif	Associated with Harry's battle with the Basilisk in the Chamber of Secrets	The Chamber of Secrets

=== First appearance in The Prisoner of Azkaban ===
Theme	Description	Scores Heard in
Double Trouble	Works as the main thematic identity for the third score, also used in a source cue.	The Prisoner of Azkaban
Sirius Black's Theme	3-note motif that represents Sirius Black as a villainous character.	The Prisoner of Azkaban
A Window to the Past	Associated with characters that have connections to Harry's parents.	The Prisoner of Azkaban
Buckbeak's Flight	Represents Buckbeak while flying. Also used when Harry and Hermione rescue Sirius Black.	The Prisoner of Azkaban
Quidditch Motif	Secondary theme used to represent Quidditch. Reprised by Nicholas Hooper in The Half-Blood Prince during Ron's Quidditch success.	The Prisoner of Azkaban and The Half-Blood Prince
Patronus Theme	Associated with the Patronus Charm.	The Prisoner of Azkaban
Marauders' Motif	Associated with Sirius Black in animal form, Remus Lupin in werewolf form, and the Marauders' Map itself. Much like Peter Pettigrew's Theme, it uses primarily chromatic neighbours.	The Prisoner of Azkaban
Betrayal Theme	Represents Harry's emotional response upon learning his parents were betrayed and Lupin's resignation.	The Prisoner of Azkaban
Peter Pettigrew's Theme	Represents Peter Pettigrew. A similar theme is heard in Munich (2005), which Williams was working on concurrently.	The Prisoner of Azkaban, The Order of the Phoenix (recording sessions only) and The Half-Blood Prince

=== First appearance in The Goblet of Fire ===
Theme	Description	Scores Heard in
Voldemort's Theme	New thematic identity for Lord Voldemort.	The Goblet of Fire and The Order of the Phoenix
Harry's Theme	New thematic identity for Harry. Its concert suite is entitled "Harry in Winter".	The Goblet of Fire
Hogwarts' Hymn	New thematic identity for Hogwarts.	The Goblet of Fire
Durmstrang Theme	Thematic identity for Viktor Krum and Durmstrang. Also used for the Bulgarian Quidditch team.	The Goblet of Fire
Beauxbatons Theme	Thematic identity for Beauxbatons Academy of Magic.	The Goblet of Fire
Moaning Myrtle's Theme	New theme for Moaning Myrtle. Uses similar orchestration to Williams's original theme for the same character.	The Goblet of Fire
Merpeople's Theme	Associated with the Merpeople and the Second Task. First heard when Harry opens the golden egg underwater, and again when he is competing in the task.	The Goblet of Fire

=== First appearance in The Order of the Phoenix ===
Theme	Description	Scores Heard in
Professor Umbridge's Theme	Represents Hogwarts Professor Dolores Umbridge.	The Order of the Phoenix and The Half-Blood Prince
Possession Theme	Associated with Voldemort and his attempt to possess Harry.	The Order of the Phoenix and The Half-Blood Prince
Weasley's Wizard Wheezes Theme	Associated with the antics of Fred and George Weasley.	The Order of the Phoenix and The Half-Blood Prince
Dumbledore's Army Theme	Represents Dumbledore's Army and the bonding of friends.	The Order of the Phoenix and The Half-Blood Prince (tracked)
Kiss Theme	Represents Harry's love and later his friendship.	The Order of the Phoenix and The Deathly Hallows – Part 2
Ministry of Magic Theme	Represents the Ministry of Magic. Bears similarities in orchestration to Alexandre Desplat's theme for the Ministry in The Deathly Hallows – Part 1.	The Order of the Phoenix

=== First appearance in The Half-Blood Prince ===
Theme	Description	Scores Heard in
"In Noctem" Theme	Represents Albus Dumbledore.	The Half-Blood Prince
Death Eater Theme	Rhythmic ostinato for Voldemort's Death Eaters.	The Half-Blood Prince
Malfoy's Theme	Represents Draco Malfoy and his mission.	The Half-Blood Prince
Slughorn's Theme	Associated with Professor Slughorn.	The Half-Blood Prince
Harry and Hermione Theme	Represents Harry's friendship with Hermione.	The Half-Blood Prince
Ginny's Theme	New romance theme. Used specifically in reference to Ginny.	The Half-Blood Prince
Dumbledore's Farewell Theme	Associated with the death of Albus Dumbledore. Also used by Alexandre Desplat in the score for Snape's memories in The Deathly Hallows – Part 2.	The Half-Blood Prince and The Deathly Hallows – Part 2 (tracked)

=== First appearance in The Deathly Hallows – Part 1 ===
Theme	Description	Scores Heard in
Obliviate	Represents the loss of innocence of Harry, Ron, and Hermione. Main identity for the movie.	The Deathly Hallows – Part 1 and The Deathly Hallows – Part 2
Band of Brothers Theme (Friends Theme)	In The Deathly Hallows – Part 1, it represents the Order of the Phoenix. In The Deathly Hallows – Part 2, the theme is associated specifically with Neville. Also used as a theme for Ginny and Harry.	The Deathly Hallows – Part 1 and The Deathly Hallows – Part 2
Voldemort's Theme	New thematic identity for Lord Voldemort.	The Deathly Hallows – Part 1
Death Eaters	Ostinato motif representing the Death Eaters. Often played in counterpoint with Voldemort's theme.	The Deathly Hallows – Part 1
Dumbledore Theme	New thematic identity for Dumbledore and his family.	The Deathly Hallows – Part 1 and The Deathly Hallows – Part 2 (Tracked)
Horcruxes Theme	Associated with Voldemort's horcruxes. This theme is first used for the locket in Part 1.	The Deathly Hallows – Part 1 and The Deathly Hallows – Part 2
Ron's Theme or Love Theme	Theme associated with Ron and obviously as a love theme for him and Hermione. It can be heard in Ron Leaves, Ron's Speech and at the end of Hermione's Parents when Ron returns in Part 1. It is reused in Part 2 during the kiss and when Hermione and Ron search for Harry during the battle (not used).	The Deathly Hallows – Part 1 and The Deathly Hallows – Part 2
Hermione's Theme	Sweet Theme associated with Hermione. This theme can be heard prominently in the first part of Hermione's Parents and at the end of The Dumbledores. It is used again during the torture scene with Bellatrix. In the Demos of the soundtrack this theme can also be heard in the track Traveling Montage when Harry and Hermione disappear after the departure of Ron (but this track is not in the final soundtrack or movie).	The Deathly Hallows – Part 1
Deathly Hallows	Represents the Deathly Hallows as objects.	The Deathly Hallows – Part 1 and The Deathly Hallows – Part 2
Dobby's Theme	New thematic identity for Dobby.	The Deathly Hallows – Part 1
Lovegood's Theme	Represents Xenophilius Lovegood, and is often in counterpoint with the "Deathly Hallows" theme. Only heard in the credits.	The Deathly Hallows – Part 1

=== First appearance in The Deathly Hallows – Part 2 ===
Theme	Description	Scores Heard in
Lily's Theme	Associated with the memory of Harry's mother.	The Deathly Hallows – Part 2
Statues	Represents the Battle of Hogwarts.	The Deathly Hallows – Part 2
Battlefield	Secondary theme for the Battle of Hogwarts.	The Deathly Hallows – Part 2
Severus and Lily	Represents Snape's love for Harry's mother.	The Deathly Hallows – Part 2
Resurrection Theme	Represents the Resurrection Stone and life.	The Deathly Hallows – Part 2
