= Harry Potter and the Deathly Hallows – Part 1 (soundtrack) =

Harry Potter and the Deathly Hallows - Part 1 (Original Motion Picture Soundtrack)

Film score by Alexandre Desplat
- Released: 16 November 2010
- Recorded: Summer 2010
- Studio: Abbey Road Studios (London)
- Genre: Film score
- Length: 73:38
- Label: WaterTower Music
- Producers: Alexandre Desplat; Conrad Pope

Harry Potter and the Deathly Hallows - Part 1 (Original Motion Picture Soundtrack) is a motion picture soundtrack to the 2010 film of the same name, composed and conducted by Alexandre Desplat. The soundtrack was nominated for the 2010 IFMCA Award for Best Original Score for a Fantasy Film and the 2010 Satellite Award for Best Original Score.

== Development ==
The score for Deathly Hallows – Part 1 was composed by Golden Globe award-winning and Academy Award-winning film composer Alexandre Desplat. Desplat followed John Williams, Patrick Doyle, and Nicholas Hooper in composing music for the Harry Potter series. Williams composed the first three films, Doyle scored the fourth film, while Hooper worked on the soundtracks for the fifth and sixth films. Desplat stated that he would compose until September 2010, with the soundtrack being released on 16 November 2010, three days before the film. A three-disc Limited Edition Collector's Box Set was also released on 21 December 2010.

In an interview, Desplat mentioned the inclusion of John Williams's Hedwig's Theme on the soundtrack. He said, "We will start this summer; it will take me all summer. I will not have many holidays, but again, it's for good reason – for the soundtrack. I would take every opportunity to use the fabulous theme composed by John Williams. I'd say it has not sufficiently been used in the latest movies, so if I have the opportunity, and if the footage allows me, I'm going to arrange it...I shall make it with great honour and pleasure." Director David Yates also talked about the use of "Hedwig's Theme" in the film, stating that the theme would be present during "anything that felt like we were being nostalgic or in a way reflective of the past." He went on by saying that the tone of the theme was altered to be in line with the mood of the film, as he "wanted it to feel like it was all getting a bit distressed. We wanted to sort of fuck it up a bit." Desplat commented on the other various major themes that he developed for the soundtrack, saying, "Since Harry, Ron and Hermione are now on the road being chased by the dark forces of Voldemort, they are never twice in the same place. They are constantly on the move. I alternate between themes by situation or location (the Ministry of Magic, the Sky Battle, the Burrows); themes by characters: Dobby, Dumbledore, Voldemort, Bathilda Bagshot, Lovegood, or several other characters; the Oblivation theme, which conveys their loss of innocence, as well as the sense of danger, and will be the leading them through their exodus; and themes for magical devices (the Detonators, the Locket, the Deathly Hallows)."

The recording sessions started on 14 August 2010 with a 105-piece of the London Symphony Orchestra performing the score, with orchestrations provided by Desplat, Conrad Pope, Jean-Pascal Beintus, Nan Schwartz, Richard Stewart, Clifford Tasner and Alejandro de la Llosa. Pope, who served as an orchestrator on the first three Potter films and the supervising orchestrator on Deathly Hallows, commented that Desplat's music is "exciting and vigorous". He added on his Facebook profile that "Harry flies, fights and conjures. All accompanied by the distinctive, definitely non-generic voice of Desplat. Those who love melodies, harmonies and emotions in their film scores should be pleased. Reminds one of the old days."

Not included on the soundtrack is "O Children" by Nick Cave and the Bad Seeds. David Yates accompanied it to a scene developed by screenwriter Steve Kloves, where Harry and Hermione share a dance in their tent after Ron leaves, to capture their shared tension, friendship and love. Kloves wrote the scene, which does not exist in the books, during filming of Harry Potter and the Half-Blood Prince, describing it as "strange", and was surprised it was well received by J.K. Rowling, Producer David Heyman and Yates. While writing the novel's tent scenes, Rowling felt Hermione and Harry were a better match, before settling on Ron and Hermione as a couple; she had not shared this with Kloves, concluding they felt the same thing at the same point in the story. Music Supervisor Matt Biffa initially read the scene as upbeat, "like two teenagers going for it" but after discussing its nuances with Yates, decided it had to be uplifting without being too romantic. It was decided it could not be a tune that had been used in film or television before, nor a song that would pull the audience out of the wizard world. Aiming for an old, soul song along the lines of James Carr and Otis Redding, and more modern material such as Oasis and Radiohead, it was determined these musicians offered too much of the Muggle world. Yates listened to 300 tracks from Biffa, "because I needed a piece of music that was poignant and tender but oddly uplifting. And I came across Nick's piece, and I loved it immediately. It has that capacity to lift you up and break your heart at the same time. My biggest fear was playing it for Dan [Radcliffe] and Emma [Watson] 'cause I thought, 'God, are they going to understand?' Because it was important to me that they understand the music as well, that they felt it. So I played it for them, and it was my most nervous moment, and I played it for them, and I was like, 'Oh, God, are they going to like it?' and they loved it." Rowling praised the scene stating, "I liked that scene because it was articulating something I hadn't said but I had felt. I really liked it... you do feel the ghost of what could have been in that scene." During Harry Potter 20th Anniversary: Return to Hogwarts, Watson admitted she initially thought the dance was awkward and wasn't sure about it, but it became one of her favourites in the franchise, "there was so much said in the scene. It was unspoken. I loved that. And also in the same way that for the characters, they got to have a moment of fun."

== Reception ==
Professional ratings
Review scores
Source	Rating
AllMusic	3.5/5 stars
BBC	Positive
Empire	4/5 stars
Filmtracks	3/5 stars
IGN	8/10 stars
Movie Music UK	5/5 stars
Movie Wave	4.5/5 stars
Shadowlocked	4/5 stars
Tracksounds	8/10 stars
Film Score Reflections	4/5 stars

The reception for the soundtrack of Part 1 was overall positive. The first review of the soundtrack was released on 31 October 2010 by Jonathan Broxton from Movie Music UK, who rated the score 5/5, saying that "This score is one of Desplat's greatest achievements and highlights everything I love about his work; the orchestral textures, the intricate use of unexpected instruments in unexpected settings, the crystal clarity of his orchestrations." Jorn Tillnes of Soundtrackgeek.com gave the score a 9/10, and remarked, "When challenged, Desplat brings out some great stuff as he proved with New Moon last year. It is a well-written score that fits perfectly with the darker Harry Potter." Caleb Leland of Shadowlocked.com gave the soundtrack 4/5 stars, stating that "While this is a good soundtrack, there's something about it that keeps it from being great. But it did make me more excited to see the new film."

Steve Ewing from Filmmusicsite.com rated the soundtrack 7/10, commenting that "Desplat was really on to something when he wrote this soundtrack, and perhaps if he had given it a little more thought, he would have recognized how close he had come to writing something outstanding. Instead, the soundtrack's musical gems come and go and never fully develop, leaving the listener disappointed by how close the soundtrack came to musical greatness." Christian Clemmensen of Filmtracks reviewed the score on 5 November 2010 and praised the orchestrations for the film but heavily criticized the sparse use of Hedwig's Theme and the poor continuity in the score when compared to previous entries in the series. Charlotte Gardner from BBC commented that "Pope's orchestration is a work of genius, heightening the music's drama with a myriad of different instrumental colours" and the score "is equally affective – menacing, comforting, magic-tinged, powerful and fragile all in one. It's particularly striking for its smooth beauty, which remains present even when painting scenes dripping with evil or fraught with pain." She went on to say that "so far, so very good. However, there is one single but sizable question mark over whether this recording is going to completely hit the spot for Potter fans. This is a work more intent on painting an atmosphere than in giving the listener motivic handles on which to grasp."

Eric Goldman from IGN wrote, "Desplat's score starts off extremely strong with 'Obliviate', which immediately sets the scene for a sad, mournful story – which is entirely appropriate, given the content of The Deathly Hallows Part 1... On one hand, it's a bit sad to not hear the wonderful Potter theme much, yet on the other hand, this is, after all, a somber story. Desplat's melancholy themes, while not always as hummable as Williams', are exactly right for this film and story." James Christopher Monger from Allmusic gave a positive review, stating, "It's been a decade since John Williams set the tone for the [Harry Potter] films, and his original theme exists only in the shadows of Harry Potter & Deathly Hallows, Pt. 1. Desplat's score is both subtle and huge, lending quiet emotional depth ('Harry & Ginny'), playful wickedness ('Death Eaters'), and tense, robust action ('The Oblivation') with masterful precision. Film series that employ this many different composers (and directors, for that matter) rarely find cohesion, and this first installment of Deathly Hallows does nothing in the way to tarnish that achievement." The soundtrack debuted at number 74 on the Billboard 200 chart in United States and also charted at number four on the Top Soundtracks Chart.

== Track listing ==
All tracks are composed, produced and conducted by Alexandre Desplat.

Standard edition
No.	Title	Music	Length
1.	"Obliviate"		3:01
2.	"Snape to Malfoy Manor"		1:58
3.	"Polyjuice Potion"	Includes Hedwig's Theme by John Williams	3:32
4.	"Sky Battle"	Includes Hedwig's Theme	3:48
5.	"At the Burrow"		2:35
6.	"Harry and Ginny"		1:43
7.	"The Will"	Includes Hedwig's Theme	3:39
8.	"Death Eaters"		3:14
9.	"Dobby"		3:49
10.	"Ministry of Magic"		1:49
11.	"Detonators"		2:23
12.	"The Locket"		1:52
13.	"Fireplaces Escape"		2:54
14.	"Ron Leaves"		2:35
15.	"The Exodus"		1:37
16.	"Godric's Hollow Graveyard"		3:15
17.	"Bathilda Bagshot"		3:54
18.	"Hermione's Parents"		5:50
19.	"Destroying the Locket"		1:10
20.	"Ron's Speech"		2:16
21.	"Lovegood"		3:27
22.	"The Deathly Hallows"		3:17
23.	"Captured and Tortured"		2:56
24.	"Rescuing Hermione"		1:50
25.	"Farewell to Dobby"		3:43
26.	"The Elder Wand"		1:38
Total length:			73:38

Deluxe iTunes and Amazon bonus tracks
No.	Title	Length
1.	"Voldemort"	4:18
2.	"The Dumbledores"	2:09
3.	"Bellatrix"	2:11
4.	"Making of the Soundtrack" (video)	3:50

Limited Edition bonus disc
No.	Title	Lyrics	Length
1.	"Voldemort"		4:18
2.	"Grimmauld Place"		2:13
3.	"The Dumbledores"		2:09
4.	"The Tale of the Three Brothers"		1:53
5.	"Bellatrix"		2:11
6.	"My Love Is Always Here"	Gerard McCann	3:05

== Personnel ==
Personnel adapted from the album liner notes.

- Piers Adams – recorder
- John Barrett – assistant engineer
- David Barron – executive producer
- Jean-Pascal Beintus – orchestration
- Clive Bell – shakuhachi
- Paul Broucek – executive in charge of music
- Peter Clarke – music editor
- Paul Clarvis – ethnic percussion
- Peter Cobbin – mixing, recording
- Charles Cole – choir master
- Alexandre Desplat – composer, conductor, flute, liner notes, orchestration, percussion, piano, producer
- Ninon Desplat – score coordinator
- Terry Edwards – choir master
- Xavier Forcioli – score coordinator
- Rebecca Gilliver – cello
- Mark Graham – music preparation
- David Heyman – executive producer
- Robert Houston – score editor
- Allan Jenkins – music editor
- Lewis Jones – Pro-Tools
- Jill Kemp – recorder
- Gabriella Kitto – soprano (vocal)
- Annabel Knight – recorder
- Carmine Lauri – concert master
- Jakob Lindberg – theorbo
- Jason Linn – executive in charge of music
- London Oratory – junior choir, chorus
- London Symphony Orchestra – orchestra
- London Voices – choir, chorus
- Sue Mallet – music contractor
- Lisa Margolis – music business affairs
- Gerard McCann – supervising music editor
- Eoghan McNelis – soprano (vocal)
- David Miller – lute, theorbo
- Stuart Morton – music editor
- John Parricelli – guitar
- Patrick Phillips – assistant engineer
- Conrad Pope – producer, supervising orchestrator
- Paul Pritchard – assistant engineer
- Katie Reynolds – post-production supervisor
- Sam Okell – mixing, recording
- Schola Cantorum of the Cardinal Vaughan Memorial School – choir, chorus
- Nan Schwartz – orchestration
- Sandeep Sriram – art direction
- Alison Stephens – mandolin
- Marc Stevens – music contractor
- Clifford Jay Tasner – orchestration
- Katie Trethewey – soprano (vocal)
- David Walter – MIDI programming
- Kirsty Whalley – score editor
- John Williams – original composer of Hedwig's Theme
- David Yates – executive producer, liner notes

== Charts ==
Chart (2010)	Peak position
US Billboard 200	74
US Top Independent Albums	6
US Top Soundtracks	4
