= Chamber of Secrets (disambiguation) =

Chamber of Secrets may refer to:

- Great Pyramid of Giza, the Chamber of Secrets inside The Great Pyramid of Giza in Egypt, approx. 2500 BCE
- Solomon's Temple, Chamber of Secrets in Solomon's Temple, built 953 BCE

Chamber of Secrets may also refer to the location at Hogwarts, a fictional school in the Harry Potter series by J.K. Rowling

- Harry Potter and the Chamber of Secrets, the second novel in the Harry Potter series
- Harry Potter and the Chamber of Secrets (film), a film adaptation of the novel directed by Chris Columbus
- Harry Potter and the Chamber of Secrets (soundtrack), the soundtrack to the film composed by John Williams
- Harry Potter and the Chamber of Secrets (video game), the game based on the film
