= Minority Report (soundtrack) =

Minority Report (Original Motion Picture Score)

Film score by John Williams
- Released: June 18, 2002
- Recorded: 2002
- Studio: Sony Scoring Stage; Culver City, California
- Genre: Film score
- Length: 73:56
- Label: DreamWorks; Fox Music

John Williams chronology
| Star Wars Episode II: Attack of the Clones (2002) | Minority Report (2002) | Harry Potter and the Chamber of Secrets (2002) |

Minority Report (Original Motion Picture Score) is the score album to the 2002 film of the same name directed by Steven Spielberg. The music was released on June 18, 2002, by DreamWorks Records and Fox Music in CD, vinyl and cassettes. The score was composed and conducted by Spielberg's regular collaborator John Williams and performed by the Hollywood Studio Symphony, with orchestration done by John Neufeld, Conrad Pope, Eddie Karam and Miriam A. Mayer, and vocal harmonies by Deborah Dietrich.

Despite being a science fiction film, Williams did not focus on science fiction elements, and used traditional noir to suit with some of the sequences, while melodic themes were composed for the film's emotional sequences. Several classical pieces were used in the score, including Franz Schubert's Symphony No. 8, Tchaikovsky's Symphony No. 6, and recurring minuet from the Haydn string quartet (Op. 64, No. 1), while electronic instrumentation, which was used in Spielberg's previous film A.I. Artificial Intelligence (2001; also scored by Williams), oriental percussions and vocal harmonies, were also used for this score. Upon its release, the music received mixed reviews from critics, praising the compositions and Williams' instrumental and orchestral approach, but criticised the predictability in the tunes, as well the incorporation of themes from popular composers in the score, though Williams said the score is inspired from Bernard Herrmann's work.

In April 2014, the score was re-released by Geffen Records for music streaming services and music download. In 2019, a 2-disc limited "expanded edition" was released through La-La-Land Records featuring the full score as heard in the film, along with several alternate and unused tracks as bonus material.

Williams' score for Minority Report won BMI Film Music Award and Critics' Choice Movie Award for Best Score, while also receiving a nomination for Saturn Award for Best Music. The score was ruled ineligible for nomination in the Best Original Score category the 75th Academy Awards, due to the prominent use of Schubert's and Tchaikovsky's classical pieces in the film. Williams was nominated for the same category in another Spielberg film, Catch Me If You Can, but was lost to Elliot Goldenthal's score for Frida.

== Production ==
Professional ratings
Review scores
| Source | Rating |
|---|---|
| AllMusic | 2.5/5 stars |
| Empire | 4/5 stars |
| Filmtracks | 3/5 stars |
| Movie Wave | 3/5 stars |
| SoundtrackNet | 3.5/5 stars |
| Tracksounds | 8/10 stars |

Williams normally enters Spielberg productions at an early stage, well before the film's shooting. For Minority Report however, his entry was delayed as he was scoring for Star Wars: Episode II – Attack of the Clones, and joined the film when it was nearly completed, leaving him minimal production time. The soundtrack is inspired from Bernard Herrmann's work. While scoring for the film, Williams decided not to focus on the science fiction elements, and made a score suitable for film noir. He included traditional noir elements such as a female singer (vocal harmonies by Deborah Dietrich) in the Anne Lively scenes, but for the "sentimental scenes", which Williams considered unusual for that genre, led to soothing themes for Anderton's ex-wife Lara and son Sean. According to music critic Andrew Granade, the track "Sean's Theme" is described as the only one "instantly recognizable as one of Williams'". Spielberg typified it as "a black and white score" and said, "I think Johnny [John] Williams does a really nice bit of homage to Benny Herrmann."

In an interview which appeared in The New York Times, Williams said that the choices for many of the pieces of classical music were made by the studio. He also said that while he did not know why certain pieces were chosen, Franz Schubert's Symphony No. 8 (commonly known as the Unfinished Symphony), which features prominently in the film, was most likely included because Anderton was a big fan of classical music in the script. Some of the other choices, such as Gideon's playing of "Jesu, Joy of Man's Desiring" by Bach on an organ in the subterranean prison, were also in the screenplay, and he figured that "They are some writer's conception of what this character might have listened to." Williams did choose the minuet from a Haydn string quartet (Op. 64, No. 1) which plays on the radio in the scene where Dr. Hineman is gardening in her greenhouse. He said he picked the piece because "It seemed to me to be the kind of thing a woman like this would play on the radio." James R. Oestreich in The New York Times characterized the score as "evocative" and said it was "thoroughly modern" while also being "interlaced with striking snippets of masterworks", including the "lopsided waltz" from the second movement of Tchaikovsky's Symphony No. 6, known as the Pathétique.

== Critical response ==
The soundtrack opened to mostly mixed critical response, praising Williams' composition, orchestration, and the approach done for the score, but criticised the predictability on the tunes, and heavily reliant on incorporating other composer's work. William Ruhlmann of AllMusic called the score as "a pretty hackneyed piece of work, since Williams' musical storytelling touches on numerous clichés in conveying dread and suspense". He added that "the tone is simply not natural for him, and he falls back on stereotypes that sound like they come from movies from the '40s and '50s" while also interpreting on his inspiration from composers John Carpenter and Philip Glass in creating discomfiting effects. Ruhlmann, however praised the end credits track "A New Beginning" as it "sounded like Williams' theme" and called it as "one of his typical warm, melodic themes". James Southall of Movie Wave praised the "effectively dark soundscape" but also criticised the predictable score production.

Filmtracks.com called Minority Report as "a comparatively conservative effort that relies on Williams' general orchestral skills rather than branching off into new territory. That is a shame, because with the talent that the maestro had displayed on a regular basis, as well as the constraints of conventional sequel scores, it was disappointing to hear him miss an opportunity to go off on a wild excursion into the musical unknown. If the film itself is compared to a pre-crime case, then Williams scored the present investigation rather than the time and place at which that crime will eventually take occur." For the expanded edition, the review further stated "The additional, technically proficient but cold material passes by without the gripping depth of emotion that we have come to expect from Williams, and the interesting references to [Bernard] Herrmann's work and periodic bursts of riveting action are somewhat diluted by the pleasantly positive finale meant to satisfy Spielberg's need for hopelessly optimistic Hollywood endings. The action cues are split apart on the longer album, spreading out the rhythmically cohesive moments. Only a handful of the chase sequences are intriguing enough in their construction."

Music critic Andrew Grenade, however praised the soundtrack, giving 3.5 stars out of 5, with Williams' use of electronic instrumentation compared to his work in A.I. Artificial Intelligence (2001), female vocalists as well as the oriental drumming in the brief moments, which led to compare Tan Dun's approach in the score of Crouching Tiger, Hidden Dragon (2000). The use of new instrumental timbres and source music from other classical compositions, was praised, and called as the "delightful aspects" of the score. Irrespective of the critically mixed reception, CBR.com listed it as "one of the best scores of John Williams", whereas Screen Rant and Los Angeles Times called it as "one of the underrated scores by the composer".

== Track listing ==
=== Standard edition ===
| No. | Title | Length |
|---|---|---|
| 1. | "Minority Report" | 6:29 |
| 2. | ""Can You See?"" | 2:12 |
| 3. | "Pre-Crime to the Rescue" | 5:48 |
| 4. | "Sean and Lara" | 4:46 |
| 5. | "Spyders" | 4:33 |
| 6. | "The Greenhouse Effect" | 5:09 |
| 7. | "Eye-Dentiscan" | 4:48 |
| 8. | "Everybody Runs" | 3:10 |
| 9. | "Sean's Theme" | 1:57 |
| 10. | "Anderton's Great Escape" | 6:47 |
| 11. | "Dr. Eddie and Miss Van Eych" | 3:08 |
| 12. | "Visions of Anne Lively" | 3:27 |
| 13. | "Leo Crow ... The Confrontation" | 5:55 |
| 14. | ""Sean" by Agatha" | 4:59 |
| 15. | "Psychic Truth and Finale" | 7:10 |
| 16. | "A New Beginning" | 3:29 |
| Total length: | | 73:56 |

=== Expanded edition ===
Disc 1
| No. | Title | Length |
|---|---|---|
| 1. | "The Crime" | 1:11 |
| 2. | "Creating The Red Balls" | 1:58 |
| 3. | "Pre-Crime To The Rescue (Part 1)" | 4:28 |
| 4. | "Pre-Crime To The Rescue (Part 2)" | 3:54 |
| 5. | "Images Of Sean" | 3:52 |
| 6. | "Presenting The Precogs" | 4:24 |
| 7. | "Agatha And The Containment Center" | 2:16 |
| 8. | "First Vision Of Anne Lively" | 2:20 |
| 9. | "Suspicion" | 1:09 |
| 10. | "The Elevator And The Collage" | 1:54 |
| 11. | "On The Run" | 2:24 |
| 12. | "Anderton Escapes" | 4:05 |
| 13. | "The Conveyor Belt" | 4:16 |
| 14. | "The Greenhouse Effect (Extended Version)" | 5:28 |
| 15. | "The Operating Room" | 1:23 |
| 16. | "Dr. Eddie And Miss Van Eyck" | 3:18 |
| 17. | "The Swimming Pool" | 3:58 |
| 18. | "Deploying The Spyders" | 2:34 |
| 19. | "Freezing Water" | 2:05 |
| 20. | "Saving The Eye" | 3:26 |
| 21. | "How Much Time Have We Got?" | 1:07 |
| 22. | "Another Vision" | 3:07 |
| 23. | "The Man In The Window" | 1:27 |
| 24. | "Leo Crow… The Confrontation" | 5:59 |
| 25. | "The Revelation" | 2:52 |
| Total length: | | 75:05 |

Disc 2
| No. | Title | Length |
|---|---|---|
| 1. | ""Sean" By Agatha (Extended Version)" | 5:13 |
| 2. | "Run!" | 1:10 |
| 3. | "Anderton In Halo" | 2:44 |
| 4. | "I Never Said She Drowned" | 1:27 |
| 5. | "Confronting Lamar" | 3:54 |
| 6. | "Thought Transference And Finale" | 3:33 |
| 7. | "A New Beginning (Film Version)" | 1:49 |
| 8. | "Sean's Theme" | 1:58 |
| 9. | "Minority Report" | 6:31 |
| Total length: | | 46:23 |

Additional music
| No. | Title | Length |
|---|---|---|
| 10. | "Pre-Crime Commercial" | 1:03 |
| 11. | "The Crime (Alternate)" | 1:14 |
| 12. | "The Collage (Alternate)" | 1:01 |
| 13. | "Anderton Escapes (Alternate Segment)" | 2:42 |
| 14. | "Freezing Water (Alternate)" | 2:13 |
| 15. | "The Man In The Window (Alternate)" | 0:50 |
| 16. | "“Sean” By Agatha (Alternate)" | 5:11 |
| 17. | "A New Beginning" | 3:29 |
| Total length: | | 17:43 |

=== Vinyl and cassette release (Standard) ===
Side A
| No. | Title | Length |
|---|---|---|
| 1. | "Minority Report" | 6:29 |
| 2. | ""Can You See?"" | 2:12 |
| 3. | "Pre-Crime to the Rescue" | 5:48 |
| 4. | "Sean and Lara" | 4:46 |
| 5. | "Spyders" | 4:33 |
| 6. | "The Greenhouse Effect" | 5:09 |
| 7. | "Eye-Dentiscan" | 4:48 |
| 8. | "Everybody Runs" | 3:10 |

Side B
| No. | Title | Length |
|---|---|---|
| 1. | "Sean's Theme" | 1:57 |
| 2. | "Anderton's Great Escape" | 6:47 |
| 3. | "Dr. Eddie and Miss Van Eych" | 3:08 |
| 4. | "Visions of Anne Lively" | 3:27 |
| 5. | "Leo Crow ... The Confrontation" | 5:55 |
| 6. | ""Sean" by Agatha" | 4:59 |
| 7. | "Psychic Truth and Finale" | 7:10 |
| 8. | "A New Beginning" | 3:29 |

== Personnel credits ==
Credits adapted from CD liner notes

Production

- Composer, conductor and producer: John Williams
- Orchestra: The Hollywood Studio Symphony
- Recorded at: Sony Scoring Stage
- Recording engineer, mixing: Shawn Murphy
- Assistant recording engineer: Sue McLean
- Mastered at: Bernie Grundman Mastering
- Mastering: Patricia Sullivan Fourstar
- Re-mastered at: Post Haste Sound
- Production, editing and re-mastering (expanded edition): Mike Matessino
- Music editor: Ken Wannberg
- Music contractor: Sandy de Crescent
- Copyist: Andrew D. Hauschild, Andrew J. Kinney, Barrett F. O'Hara, Bonnie L. Cook, Bronwyn Oswell, Carl A. Rydlund, Danail G. Getz, Deborah S. Mitchell Jones, Derrick Lefebvre, Elizabeth J. Kinnon, Howard J. Segurson, James F. Hoffman, Jennifer Kuhn, James W. Honeyman, JoAnn Kane, John Eidsvoog, Jon K. Marquart, Josef Zimmerman, Joshua E. Segal, Julia A. Eidsvoog, Junko Tamura, Karen Guthery, Katherine E. Salvidge, Larry B. Rench, Lars Clutterham, Mark Graham, Marni A. Sanders, Penka D. Kouneva, Ronald F. Gorow, Russell W. Bartmus, Stephen A. Cartotto, Steven Lee Smith, Thomas G. Brown*, Vince Bartold, William M. Francis III
- Music preparation: JoAnn Kane Music Service
- Scoring crew: Adam Michalak, Jason Lloyd, Mark Eshelman, Patrick Weber

Instrumentation and orchestration

- Bass: Bruce P. Morgenthaler, Christian C. Kollgaard, Drew D. Dembowski, Edward Meares, Michael Valerio, Nico C. Abondolo, Nicolas Philippon, Oscar Hidalgo, Richard Feves, Steve Edelman, Susan A. Ranney
- Bassoon: Allen M. Savedoff, David W. Riddles, Kenneth E. Munday, Michael R. O'Donovan, Rose Corrigan
- Cello: J. Antony Cooke, Armen Ksajikian, Cecilia Tsan, Christine Ermacoff, Dane R. Little, David Low, David Speltz, Dennis Karmazyn, John A. Walz, Larry Corbett, Paul A. Cohen, Roger Lebow, Sebastian Toettcher, Stephen P. Erdody, Steve Richards, Timothy E. Landauer, Todd Hemmenway, Trevor Handy
- Clarinet: Emily Bernstein, Gary S. Bovyer, John Neufeld, Marty Krystall
- Flute: Geraldine Rotella, James R. Walker, Louise M. Di Tullio Dissman, Sheridon W. Stokes
- French horn: Brian D. A. O'Connor, David A. Duke, James W. Thatcher, John A. Reynolds, Phillip E. Yao, Richard J. Todd, Steven B. Becknell
- Harp: JoAnn Turovsky, Marcia Dickstein
- Keyboards: Chet Swiatkowski, Michael Fisher, Michael A. Lang, Paul S. Haslinger, Randy M. Kerber, Richard Ruttenberg
- Oboe: Barbara Northcutt, Earle D. Dumler, Leanne Becknell, Leslie H. Reed, Phillip Ayling
- Orchestration: Conrad Pope, Eddie Karam, John Neufeld, Miriam A. Mayer
- Orchestra leader: John Williams
- Percussion: Alan Estes, Donald J. Williams, Gregory Goodall, Jerry D. Williams, Peter Limonick, Thomas D. Raney
- Trombone: Andrew T. Malloy, George B. Thatcher, James Sawyer, Michael M. Hoffman, William C. Booth
- Trumpet: David W. Washburn, Jon Lewis, Malcolm McNab, Timothy G. Morrison, Warren H. Luening Jr.
- Tuba: James M. Self
- Viola: Brian Dembow, Cassandra Lynne Richburg, Darrin E. McCann, David T. Stenske, David E. Walther Jr., Donald McInnes, Janet Lakatos, John Scanlon, Karen Van Sant, Karie L. Prescott, Keith Greene, Matthew J. Funes, Michael Nowak, Piotr T. Jandula, Roland Kato, Shanti D. Randall, Simon Oswell, Steven A. Gordon, Victoria E. Miskolczy
- Violin: Aimee Kreston, Alan H. Grunfeld, Amy Hershberger, Ana Landauer, Anatoly Rosinsky, Armen Garabedian, Bruce Dukov, Clayton Haslop, Dimitrie Leivici, Elizabeth Baker, Endre Granat, Eric J. Hosler, Eun-Mee Ahn, Franklyn D'Antonio, Haim Shtrum, Helen Nightengale, Irina Voloshina, Jacqueline I. Brand, Jay Rosen, Josefina Vergara, Julie Ann Gigante, Katia K. Popov, Kenneth Yerke, Liane Mautner Reynolds, Lily Ho Chen, Lisa M. Sutton Johnson, Marc Sazer, Marina Manukian, Mario DeLeon, Mark D. Robertson, Miran Haig Kojian, Miwako Watanabe, Phillip Levy, Rachel Stegeman Purkin, Rafael Rishik, Rene M. Mandel, Richard L. Altenbach, Robin Olson, Roger D. Wilkie, Sara K. Parkins, Sungil Lee, Tamara L. Hatwan Chang
- Vocals (soloist): Deborah Dietrich

Management

- Production coordinator (Universal Music Enterprises): Paul Hall
- Executive producer: MV Gerhard, Matt Verboys
- Management (music business affairs): Andrew Labarrere
- Management (soundtrack executive for 20th Century Fox): Tom Cavanaugh
- Art direction: Jim Titus
- Product Manager (Universal Music Enterprises): Gene Zacharewicz
- Project assistance: Frank K. DeWald, Neil S. Bulk, Ron Fuglsby
- Analog transfers: Post Haste Digital

== Accolades ==
| Organization | Category | Nominee | Result | Ref. |
|---|---|---|---|---|
| BMI Film & TV Awards | Film Music Award | John Williams | Won | |
| Critics' Choice Movie Awards | Best Score | John Williams (also for Catch Me If You Can and Harry Potter and the Chamber of Secrets) | Won | |
| Saturn Awards | Best Music | John Williams (also for Episode II – Attack of the Clones) | Nominated | |

== Bibliography ==
- Osborne, Robert (2013). 85 Years of the Oscar: The Complete History of the Academy Awards. New York, United States: Abbeville Publishing Group. ISBN 978-0-7892-1142-2.
