= Prisoner of Azkaban (disambiguation) =

Prisoner of Azkaban generally refers to the novel Harry Potter and the Prisoner of Azkaban by J. K. Rowling.

Prisoner of Azkaban may also refer to:

- Harry Potter and the Prisoner of Azkaban (film), a film adaptation of the novel directed by Alfonso Cuarón
- Harry Potter and the Prisoner of Azkaban (soundtrack), the soundtrack to the film composed by John Williams
- Harry Potter and the Prisoner of Azkaban (video game), the game based on the film
- Sirius Black, the prisoner referred to in the title
