= Broadcast Film Critics Association Award for Best Family Film =

Award given by the Broadcast Film Critics Association

The Broadcast Film Critics Association Award for Best Family Film is a retired award that was handed out from 1995 to 2007.

== List of winners and nominees ==
=== 1990s ===
- 1995: Babe
- 1996: Fly Away Home
- 1997: Anastasia
- 1998: A Bug's Life
- 1999: October Sky

=== 2000s ===
2000: My Dog Skip

- Dr. Seuss' How The Grinch Stole Christmas
- The Family Man
- Remember the Titans

2001: Harry Potter and the Sorcerer's Stone

- The Princess Diaries
- Spy Kids

2002: Harry Potter and the Chamber of Secrets

- The Rookie
- Tuck Everlasting

2003: Pirates of the Caribbean: The Curse of the Black Pearl

- Freaky Friday
- Holes
- Peter Pan
- Whale Rider

2004: Finding Neverland

- Harry Potter and the Prisoner of Azkaban
- Lemony Snicket's A Series of Unfortunate Events
- Miracle
- Spider-Man 2

2005: The Chronicles of Narnia: The Lion, the Witch and the Wardrobe

- Charlie and the Chocolate Factory
- Harry Potter and the Goblet of Fire

2006: Charlotte's Web

- Akeelah and the Bee
- Flicka
- Lassie
- Pirates of the Caribbean: Dead Man's Chest

2007: Enchanted

- August Rush
- The Golden Compass
- Hairspray
- Harry Potter and the Order of the Phoenix
