= Harry Potter and the Half-Blood Prince (soundtrack) =

Harry Potter and the Half-Blood Prince (Original Motion Picture Soundtrack)

Film score by Nicholas Hooper
- Released: 14 July 2009
- Recorded: 2008
- Studio: Abbey Road Studios
- Genre: Soundtrack
- Length: 62:40
- Label: New Line Records

Professional ratings
Review scores
Source	Rating
AllMusic	3/5 stars
Empire	2/5 stars
Filmtracks	2/5 stars
Movie Music UK	4/5 stars
Movie Wave	3/5 stars

Harry Potter and the Half-Blood Prince (Original Motion Picture Soundtrack) is the soundtrack to the 2009 film of the same name, written and composed by Nicholas Hooper. The score was conducted by Hooper and Alastair King. It is the second Harry Potter film to be scored by Hooper, who also composed the score for the previous film in the series, Harry Potter and the Order of the Phoenix. The soundtrack was released on 14 July 2009, a day before the film's release, and was nominated for a Grammy Award for Best Score Soundtrack Album for a Motion Picture.

== Marketing ==
On the Harry Potter website a preview of one of the tracks (Ginny Weasley) is played in the background. On 17 June, a preview for three tracks was played in the background of film's updated official site. A 15-second audio preview for 13 tracks from the soundtrack was released on 19 June via Virgin Mobile's website. The soundtrack runs over 60 minutes in length.

On 30 June, AOL Radio previewed the whole soundtrack online.

== Reception ==
On the Billboard issue dated 1 August 2009, the album debuted at number twenty-nine on the Billboard 200 chart, thus making it the highest charting soundtrack among all the six movie soundtracks released. The soundtrack also charted at three on the Top Soundtracks Chart.

== Track listing ==
Harry Potter and the Half-Blood Prince (Original Motion Picture Soundtrack) track listing
No.	Title	Music	Length
1.	"Opening"	Includes Hedwig's Theme by John Williams	2:53
2.	"In Noctem"		2:00
3.	"The Story Begins"		2:05
4.	"Ginny"	Includes Hedwig's Theme	1:30
5.	"Snape & The Unbreakable Vow"		2:50
6.	"Wizard Wheezes"		1:42
7.	"Dumbledore's Speech"		1:31
8.	"Living Death"		1:55
9.	"Into The Pensieve"		1:45
10.	"The Book"		1:44
11.	"Ron's Victory"	Includes Quidditch, Year Three by John Williams	1:44
12.	"Harry & Hermione"		2:52
13.	"School!"		1:05
14.	"Malfoy's Mission"		2:53
15.	"The Slug Party"		2:11
16.	"Into The Rushes"		2:33
17.	"Farewell Aragog"		2:08
18.	"Dumbledore's Foreboding"		1:18
19.	"Of Love & War"		1:17
20.	"When Ginny Kissed Harry"		2:38
21.	"Slughorn's Confession"		3:33
22.	"Journey to the Cave"		3:08
23.	"The Drink of Despair"		2:44
24.	"Inferi in the Firestorm"		1:53
25.	"The Killing of Dumbledore"		3:34
26.	"Dumbledore's Farewell"		2:22
27.	"The Friends"		2:00
28.	"The Weasley Stomp"		2:51
Total length:			62:40

Not included on the soundtrack were "Friends and Love" (a compilation of "When Ginny Kissed Harry" and "Harry and Hermione" that came with purchasing a ticket for the movie on Fandango), "Big Beat Repeat" (heard in the Gryffindor common room after the Quidditch match) by Josh Powell, and a track that could be named "Murder & Escape" (heard when Dumbledore falls from the Astronomy Tower and Harry pursues Snape).

== Track details ==
The score for Half-Blood Prince was conducted by Hooper and Alastair King and performed by the Chamber Orchestra of London, the orchestra that performed the score for Order of the Phoenix, with orchestrations provided by King, Jeff Atmajian, Simon Whiteside, Daryl Griffith and Bradley Farmer. The score featured a more significant role for light choir. Thematically, Hooper referenced his own ideas from the previous score and several elements from Williams' work.

Hooper stated that "Placing John Williams' themes became obvious as we went along. The beginning of the film has to have at least a hint of 'Hedwig's Theme'."

- "Opening": After a brief quotage of "Hedwig's Theme", in which Hooper lifts one note by semi-tone, elements of light choir are introduced. The use of Hooper's choral theme throughout the score is a reference to Dumbledore and the events that would entail, regarding his character and the climax of the film. A driving theme that reoccurs in "Into the Rushes" is used here to represent the Death Eaters and the havoc that they inflict in this sixth film. Hooper extends his use of percussion, with violent off-beat anvil that cuts through the repetitively propulsive, galvanic string figure.
- "Ron's Victory": Hooper uses several variations on themes from Williams' piece "Quidditch, Third Year".
- "Inferi in the Firestorm": Hooper utilises not only whirls of dissonant strings but also an orchestral sound that Williams used previously in Harry Potter and the Prisoner of Azkaban, particularly in the tracks "The Dementors Converge" and "Finale".
- "Dumbledore's Farewell" is reused by Alexandre Desplat in the Harry Potter and the Deathly Hallows – Part 2 theme "Severus and Lily", which is used in the scene where Harry views Snape's memories in the Pensieve.

== Awards ==
Award	Category/Recipient(s)	Result
Grammy Award	Best Score Soundtrack Album For Motion Picture, Television Or Other Visual Media	Nominated

== Charts ==
Weekly chart performance for Harry Potter And The Half-Blood Prince
Chart (2025)	Peak position
Hungarian Physical Albums (MAHASZ)	24
