= Harry Potter and the Chamber of Secrets (soundtrack) =

Harry Potter and the Chamber of Secrets (Original Motion Picture Soundtrack)

Film score by John Williams
- Released: 12 November 2002
- Recorded: August – September 2002
- Studios: Abbey Road Studios, London
- Genre: Soundtrack
- Length: 70:08
- Labels: Warner/Sunset; Nonesuch; Atlantic

John Williams chronology
Minority Report (2002)	Harry Potter and the Chamber of Secrets (Original Motion Picture Soundtrack) (2002)	Catch Me If You Can (2002)

Professional ratings
Review scores
Source	Rating
Filmtracks	4/5 stars
Movie Music UK	5/5 stars
Movie Wave	4/5 stars
SoundtrackNet	4/5 stars

Harry Potter and the Chamber of Secrets (Original Motion Picture Soundtrack) is the film score to the 2002 film of the same name, composed by John Williams and conducted by William Ross. The score was originally supposed to be entirely conducted by Williams, but due to scheduling conflicts with the scoring of Steven Spielberg's film Catch Me If You Can, Ross was brought in to adapt Williams' material from Philosopher's Stone and conduct the scoring sessions with the London Symphony Orchestra with orchestrations provided by Conrad Pope, Eddie Karam and Pete Anthony.

Upon its release, the album was available in one of five different collectible character cards covers over the main insert. The cards included Harry, Ron with a Mandrake, Hermione, Dumbledore, and Hagrid with Fang.

The soundtrack was released on 12 November 2002, and was a Grammy Award nominee for the Best Score Soundtrack for Visual Media in 2003. It charted on the Billboard 200 at 81 and also charted at 5 on the Top Soundtracks Chart. In Japan, the album was certified gold by the RIAJ for 100,000 copies shipped to stores. In 2018, La-La-Land Records released a complete version of the score in a two-disc CD as part of a three soundtrack set featuring the scores for the first three Harry Potter films.

== Track listing ==
=== Original Release ===
No.	Title	Length
1.	"Prologue: Book II and the Escape from the Dursleys (Contains Hedwig's Theme)"	3:31
2.	"Fawkes the Phoenix"	3:45
3.	"The Chamber of Secrets"	3:49
4.	"Gilderoy Lockhart"	2:05
5.	"The Flying Car (Contains Hedwig's Theme)"	4:08
6.	"Knockturn Alley (Contains Hedwig's Theme)"	1:47
7.	"Introducing Colin"	1:49
8.	"The Dueling Club"	4:08
9.	"Dobby the House Elf"	3:27
10.	"The Spiders"	4:32
11.	"Moaning Myrtle"	2:05
12.	"Meeting Aragog"	3:18
13.	"Fawkes Is Reborn"	3:19
14.	"Meeting Tom Riddle"	3:38
15.	"Cornish Pixies"	2:13
16.	"Polyjuice Potion"	3:52
17.	"Cakes for Crabbe and Goyle"	3:30
18.	"Dueling the Basilisk (Contains Hedwig's Theme)"	5:02
19.	"Reunion of Friends (Contains Hedwig's Theme)"	5:08
20.	"Harry's Wondrous World (Contains Hedwig's Theme)"	5:02
Total length:		70:08

=== Harry Potter - The John Williams Soundtrack Collection: Disc 4 ===
The Film Score
No.	Title	Length
1.	"Prologue: Book II (Contains Hedwig's Theme)"	1:37
2.	"Vernon Gathers Family / Enter Dobby"	2:15
3.	"Dobby Warns Harry"	2:17
4.	"The Escape from the Dursleys"	3:25
5.	"Magical Household / Letters from Hogwarts (Contains Hedwig's Theme)"	2:42
6.	"Borgin and Burkes"	0:53
7.	"Knockturn Alley (Contains Hedwig's Theme)"	1:51
8.	"Flourish and Blotts / Harry Meets Lucius Malfoy"	3:25
9.	"The Train Station / The Flying Car (Contains Hedwig's Theme)"	6:01
10.	"Whomping Willow / The Car Escapes"	1:55
11.	"Filch's Warning / Boys Receive Detention (Contains Hedwig's Theme)"	2:06
12.	"Introducing Colin / Errol Delivers Mail"	0:55
13.	"Gilderoy Lockhart"	2:09
14.	"Cornish Pixies"	2:15
15.	"Eat Slugs"	1:43
16.	"Hermione and Hagrid (Contains Hedwig's Theme)"	1:20
17.	"The Writing on the Wall (Contains Hedwig's Theme)"	3:21
18.	"Dumbledore's Caution (Contains Hedwig's Theme)"	2:01
19.	"The Library / Transformation Class"	4:03
20.	"Quidditch, Second Year"	6:15
21.	"Petrified Colin"	2:26
22.	"Moaning Myrtle Appears"	0:55
23.	"The Dueling Club [Extended Version]"	4:25
24.	"Harry Is A Parselmouth"	0:54
25.	"Petrified Justin"	2:37
26.	"Harry Meets Fawkes"	2:17
27.	"Christmas Break"	2:31
28.	"Cakes for Crabbe and Goyle / Polyjuice Potion"	4:14
29.	"Potion Wears Off / The Diary (Contains Hedwig's Theme)"	3:29

=== Harry Potter - The John Williams Soundtrack Collection: Disc 5 ===
The Film Score (continued)
No.	Title	Length
1.	"Meeting Tom Riddle [Extended Version] (Contains Hedwig's Theme)"	4:06
2.	"Ransacked Dormitory / Petrified Hermione"	1:56
3.	"Dad's Cloak / Hagrid's Arrest (Contains Hedwig's Theme)"	4:55
4.	"Follow the Spiders"	1:16
5.	"Meeting Aragog"	3:21
6.	"The Spiders Attack (Contains Hedwig's Theme)"	3:55
7.	"Car Drives Off / It's A Basilisk (Contains Hedwig's Theme)"	2:14
8.	"Ginny Gets Snatched"	2:24
9.	"Myrtle's Tale"	1:31
10.	"The Chamber Opens / The Search for Ginny"	3:29
11.	"Dueling the Basilisk"	5:06
12.	"Fawkes Heals Harry"	1:34
13.	"Dumbledore and Harry (Contains Hedwig's Theme)"	2:42
14.	"Lucius Returns / Dobby Is Freed (Contains Hedwig's Theme)"	4:01
15.	"Reunion of Friends (Contains Hedwig's Theme)"	5:12

End Credits Suite
No.	Title	Length
16.	"Harry's Wondrous World (Contains Hedwig's Theme)"	5:02
17.	"Fawkes the Phoenix"	3:47
18.	"The Chamber of Secrets"	3:51

Additional Music
No.	Title	Length
19.	"Dobby the House Elf"	3:32
20.	"Prologue: Book II [Alternate] (Contains Hedwig's Theme)"	1:28
21.	"Filch's Warning [Alternate]"	0:22
22.	"Introducing Colin [Alternate]"	0:55
23.	"Transformation Class [Alternate Segment]"	0:58
24.	"Petrified Colin [Alternate]"	2:35
25.	"Christmas Break [Short Version]"	1:04
26.	"Follow the Spiders [Alternate]"	1:23
27.	"Car Drives Off [Alternate Segment]"	0:26
28.	"Fawkes Heals Harry [Alternate]"	1:33
29.	"Television Commercial No. 1 (Contains Hedwig's Theme)"	0:38
30.	"Television Commercial No. 2 (Contains Hedwig's Theme)"	0:30
31.	"Television Commercial No. 3 (Contains Hedwig's Theme)"	1:07

== Charts ==
Weekly chart performance for Harry Potter And The Chamber Of Secrets
Chart (2025)	Peak position
Hungarian Physical Albums (MAHASZ)	26
