= Harry Potter and the Chamber of Secrets (film) =

2002 film by Chris Columbus

- Theatrical release poster
- Directed by: Chris Columbus
- Screenplay by: Steve Kloves
- Based on: Harry Potter and the Chamber of Secrets by J. K. Rowling
- Produced by: David Heyman
- Starring: Daniel Radcliffe; Rupert Grint; Emma Watson; Kenneth Branagh; John Cleese; Robbie Coltrane; Warwick Davis; Richard Griffiths; Richard Harris; Jason Isaacs; Alan Rickman; Fiona Shaw; Maggie Smith; Julie Walters
- Cinematography: Roger Pratt
- Edited by: Peter Honess
- Music by: John Williams
- Production companies: Warner Bros. Pictures; Heyday Films; 1492 Pictures
- Distributed by: Warner Bros. Pictures
- Release dates: 3 November 2002 (Odeon Leicester Square); 15 November 2002 (United Kingdom and United States)
- Running time: 161 minutes
- Countries: United Kingdom; United States
- Language: English
- Budget: $100 million
- Box office: $883.4 million

Harry Potter and the Chamber of Secrets is a 2002 fantasy film directed by Chris Columbus from a screenplay by Steve Kloves. It is based on the 1998 novel Harry Potter and the Chamber of Secrets by J. K. Rowling. Produced by David Heyman, it is the sequel to Harry Potter and the Philosopher's Stone (2001) and the second instalment in the Harry Potter film series. The film stars Daniel Radcliffe as Harry Potter, with Rupert Grint and Emma Watson as his best friends Ron Weasley and Hermione Granger respectively. The film follows Harry's second year at Hogwarts, where the Heir of Salazar Slytherin opens the Chamber of Secrets, unleashing a monster that petrifies the school's students.

The film was released in the United Kingdom and the United States on 15 November 2002, by Warner Bros. Pictures. It became a critical and commercial success, grossing $878 million worldwide and becoming the second-highest-grossing film of 2002. The film was nominated for several awards, including the BAFTA Award for Best Production Design, Best Sound, and Best Special Visual Effects. It was followed by Harry Potter and the Prisoner of Azkaban (2004).

== Plot ==
While Harry Potter spends the summer with the Dursleys in 1992, a house-elf named Dobby warns Harry of an "impending danger" at Hogwarts. He attempts to prevent him returning to Hogwarts by sabotaging an important dinner with Vernon Dursley's client. Vernon tries to prevent his departure in retaliation, but his friend Ron Weasley and his brothers Fred and George rescue him in their father's flying car. Harry meets up with Hermione Granger in Diagon Alley, where they meet Hogwarts's new Defence Against the Dark Arts teacher, Gilderoy Lockhart, along with Draco Malfoy and his father, Lucius, who Harry sees slip a book into Ginny Weasley's cauldron.

After being blocked from entering Platform Nine and Three-Quarters at King's Cross railway station, Harry and Ron fly the car to Hogwarts, where they crash into the Whomping Willow. Ron's wand is broken, and they each receive detention, during which Harry hears a strange voice and subsequently finds caretaker Argus Filch's cat, Mrs Norris, petrified with a message written in blood: "The Chamber of Secrets has been opened, enemies of the heir... beware." One of Hogwarts' founders, Salazar Slytherin, supposedly constructed a secret Chamber containing a monster that only his heir can control, capable of purging the school of Muggle-borns. Suspecting Malfoy to be the heir, Harry, Ron, and Hermione plan to question him.

Harry's arm is broken by a rogue Bludger in a Quidditch match; while recovering, Dobby visits him and reveals he closed the barrier and made the rogue Bludger to force him to leave the school, in addition to the Chamber having been opened in the past. After students are found petrified, Harry is suspected of being the heir of Slytherin after communicating with a snake, an ability shared with Slytherin. Disguised as Crabbe and Goyle, using polyjuice potion, which they brew in a bathroom haunted by the ghost of Moaning Myrtle, Harry and Ron learn Malfoy is not the heir, but that a Muggle-born girl died when the Chamber was last opened 50 years ago. Harry finds an enchanted diary owned by a former student Tom Marvolo Riddle, who blames a young Rubeus Hagrid for opening the Chamber, leading to his expulsion.

When Hermione is petrified, Harry and Ron question Hagrid, who is taken to Azkaban by Minister of Magic Cornelius Fudge, while Lucius forces the school governors to remove Dumbledore from office. Hagrid discreetly tells the boys to "follow the spiders"; they venture into the Forbidden Forest and meet Hagrid's spider, Aragog, who reveals Hagrid's innocence and provides another clue to the Chamber's monster. A book page the boys find in Hermione's hand identifies the monster as a basilisk, a giant serpent that kills people who make direct eye contact; the petrified victims only saw it indirectly.

Ginny is taken into the Chamber, and the teachers nominate Lockhart to save her; Harry and Ron find Lockhart preparing to flee and realize he is a fraud. Deducing that Myrtle was the Muggle-born girl that the basilisk killed, they find the Chamber's entrance in the bathroom she haunts. Once inside, Lockhart tries to erase Harry and Ron's memories and take the credit, but his spell backfires when he uses Ron's broken wand, erasing his own memory and causing a cave-in, separating Harry from Ron and Lockhart.

Harry enters the Chamber alone and finds Ginny unconscious and Riddle, Slytherin's heir and Voldemort's younger self, who reveals he used the diary to manipulate Ginny into reopening the Chamber. Harry expresses his loyalty to Dumbledore, whose pet phoenix Fawkes arrives with the Sorting Hat. Riddle summons the basilisk, who Fawkes blinds, and the Sorting Hat produces the Sword of Gryffindor, which Harry uses to kill the basilisk after a battle, but is poisoned by one of its fangs. Despite being injured, Harry stabs the diary with the basilisk fang, destroying Riddle and reviving Ginny. Harry is healed by Fawkes' tears and returns to Hogwarts with his friends and a baffled Lockhart. Harry learns that Dobby's master is Lucius, whom he accuses of planting the diary in Ginny's cauldron, and tricks him into freeing Dobby. Dumbledore is reinstated as headmaster, the basilisk's victims are healed, Hermione reunites with her friends, and Hagrid is released from Azkaban.

== Cast ==
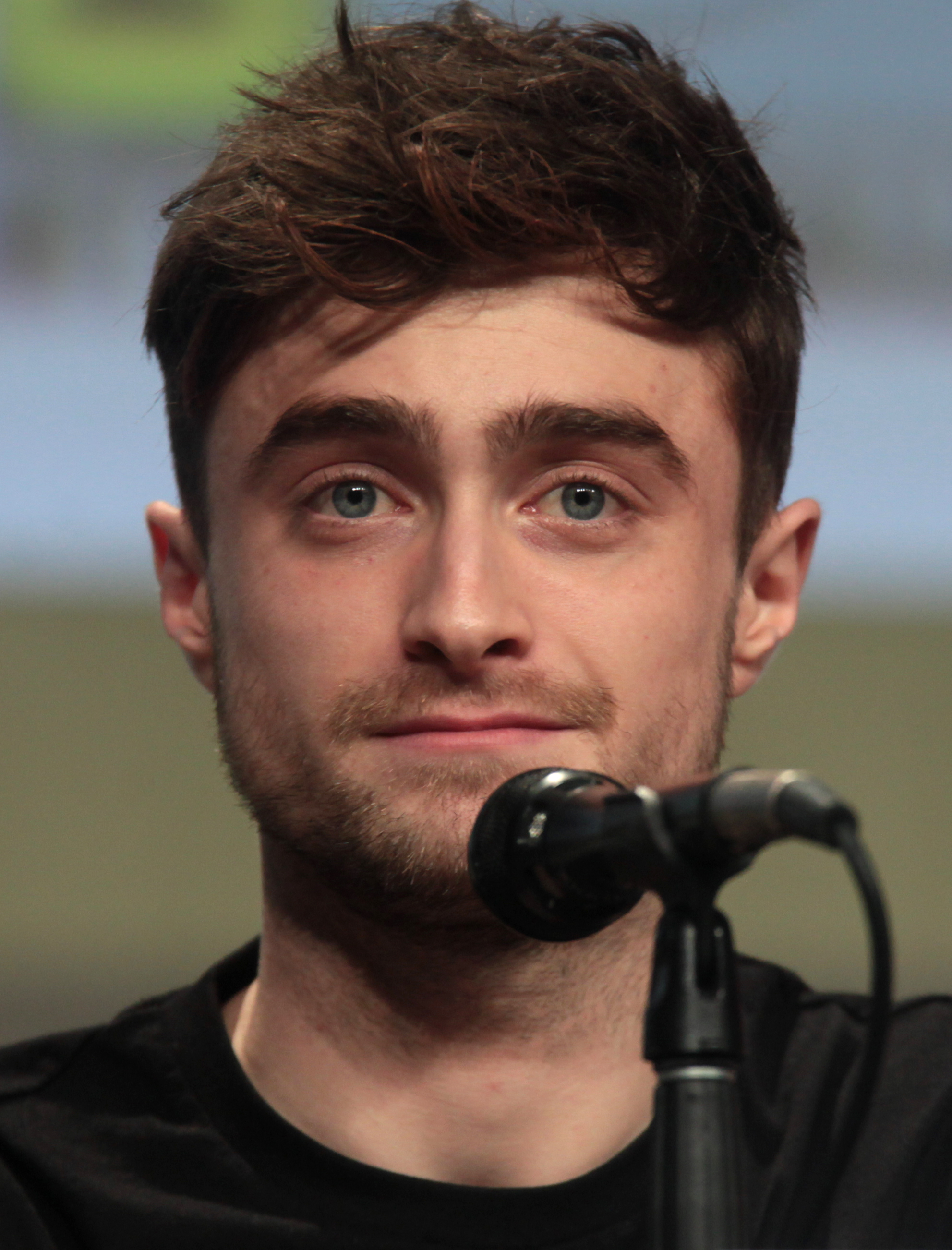
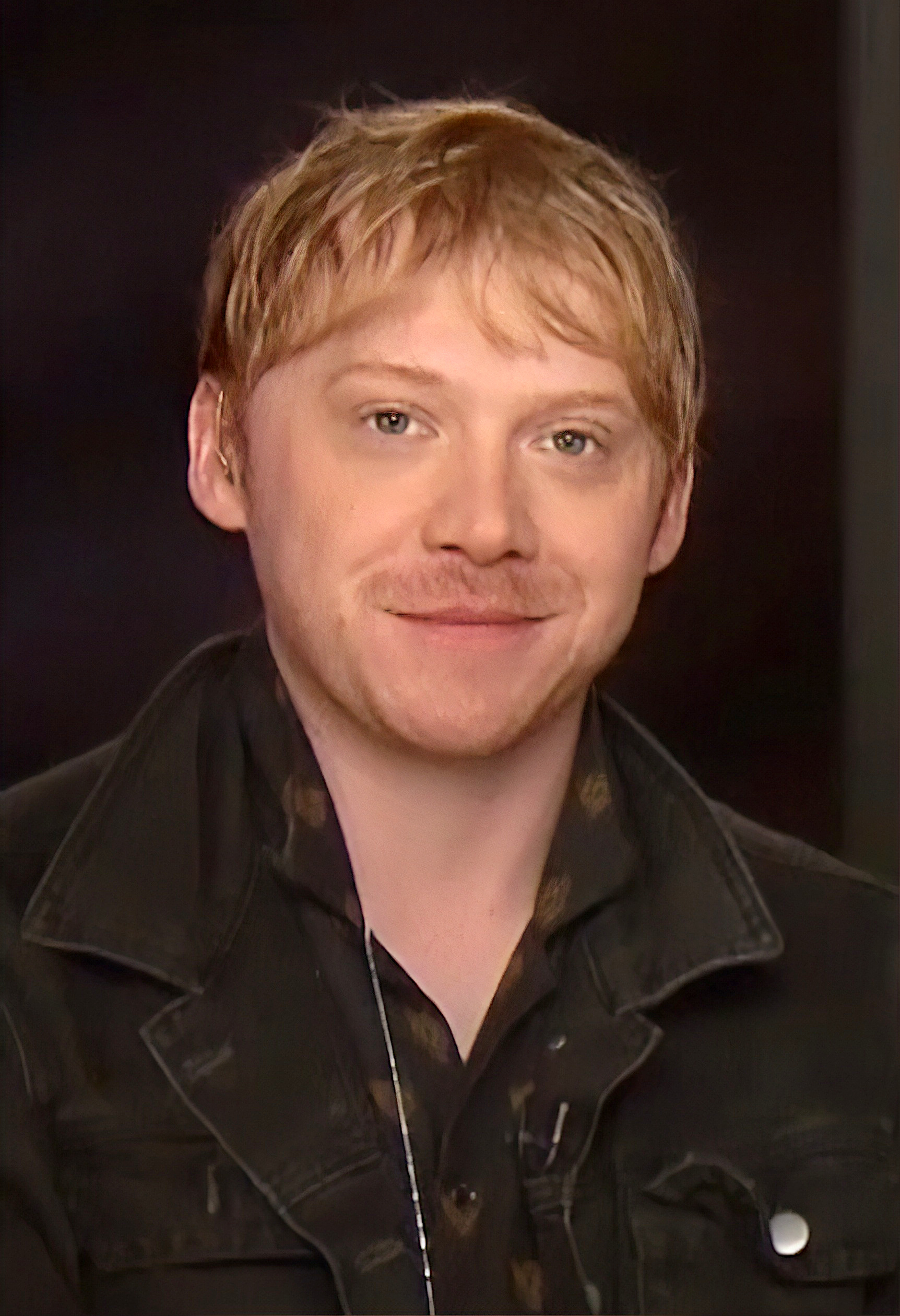
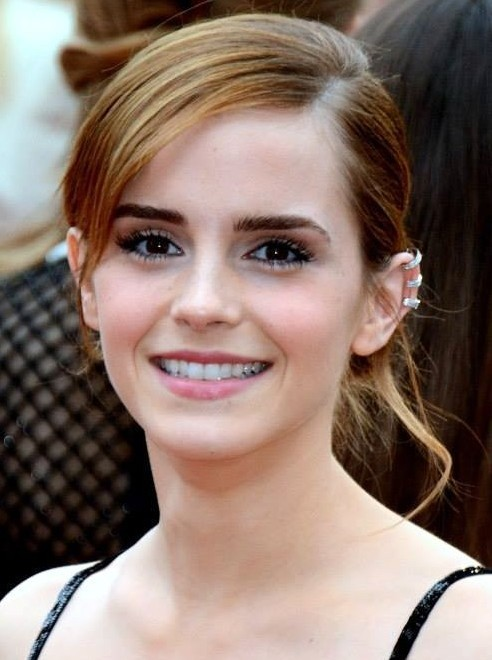
Left to right: Daniel Radcliffe (pictured in 2014), Rupert Grint (2018), and Emma Watson (2013)
- Daniel Radcliffe as Harry Potter: A 12-year-old British wizard famous for surviving his parents' murder at the hands of the evil wizard Lord Voldemort as an infant, who now enters his second year at Hogwarts School of Witchcraft and Wizardry.
- Rupert Grint as Ron Weasley: Harry's best friend at Hogwarts and one of the youngest members of the Weasley family.
- Emma Watson as Hermione Granger: Harry's other best friend and the trio's brains.
- Kenneth Branagh as Gilderoy Lockhart: A celebrity author and the new Defence Against the Dark Arts teacher at Hogwarts.
- John Cleese as Nearly Headless Nick: The ghost of Gryffindor House.
- Robbie Coltrane as Rubeus Hagrid: The half-giant gamekeeper at Hogwarts who is framed for opening the Chamber of Secrets and is sent to Azkaban on Lucius Malfoy's orders. Martin Bayfield portrays a young Hagrid with his voice dubbed by Coltrane.
- Warwick Davis as Filius Flitwick: The Charms teacher at Hogwarts and head of Ravenclaw House.
- Richard Griffiths as Vernon Dursley: Harry's abusive Muggle uncle, who despises wizards and works as a drill company director.
- Richard Harris as Albus Dumbledore: The headmaster of Hogwarts and one of the greatest wizards of the age. This was Harris' final live-action film; he died shortly before it was released. The role of Dumbledore was played by Michael Gambon from Harry Potter and the Prisoner of Azkaban onwards.
- Jason Isaacs as Lucius Malfoy: Draco's father and a former Hogwarts pupil of Slytherin House who now works as a school governor at Hogwarts. Isaacs gave Lucius a whiny tone of voice based on that of the Child Catcher of Chitty Chitty Bang Bang, whose voice had resonated with Isaacs throughout his childhood for the character scaring him. Isaacs also provided the voice of the Basilisk.
- Maggie Smith as Minerva McGonagall: The Transfiguration teacher at Hogwarts and head of Gryffindor House.
- Gemma Jones as Madame Pomfrey: The Hogwarts nurse.
- Alan Rickman as Severus Snape: The Potions teacher at Hogwarts and head of Slytherin House.
- Fiona Shaw as Petunia Dursley: Harry's Muggle aunt.
- Julie Walters as Molly Weasley: Ron's mother.
- Bonnie Wright as Ginny Weasley

Several actors from Philosopher's Stone reprise their roles in this film. Harry Melling portrays Dudley Dursley, Harry's Muggle cousin. James and Oliver Phelps play Fred and George Weasley, Ron's twin brothers; and Chris Rankin appears as Percy Weasley, Ron's other brother and a Gryffindor prefect. Tom Felton plays Draco Malfoy, Harry's rival in Slytherin, while Jamie Waylett and Joshua Herdman appear as Crabbe and Goyle, Draco's minions. Matthew Lewis, Devon Murray and Alfred Enoch play Neville Longbottom, Seamus Finnigan and Dean Thomas, respectively, three Gryffindor students in Harry's year. David Bradley portrays Argus Filch, Hogwarts' caretaker, and Sean Biggerstaff as Oliver Wood, the Keeper and Captain of the Gryffindor Quidditch team. Leslie Phillips voices the Sorting Hat. Eleanor Columbus, Chris Columbus's daughter, appears as Susan Bones, Edward Randell appears as Justin Finch-Fletchley, Charlotte Skeoch as Hannah Abbott, and Louis Doyle as Ernie MacMillan; Hufflepuff students. Emily Dale appears as Katie Bell, Rochelle Douglas as Alicia Spinnet, and Danielle Tabor as Angelina Johnson; the Chasers of the Gryffindor Quidditch team. Jamie Yeats appears as Marcus Flint; the Captain of the Slytherin Quidditch team, Scott Fearn as Adrian Pucey; and David Holmes, David Massam, and Tony Christian appear as Slytherin quidditch players. Gemma Padley appears as Penelope Clearwater, a Ravenclaw student and Percy's girlfriend. Luke Youngblood plays Lee Jordan, the Quidditch commentator.

Christian Coulson appears as Tom Marvolo Riddle, a former Hogwarts pupil, later revealed to be a manifestation of a teenage Lord Voldemort. Mark Williams portrays Arthur Weasley, Ron's father. Shirley Henderson plays Moaning Myrtle, a Hogwarts ghost. When she auditioned to play a 14-year-old Moaning Myrtle, Henderson was 37 years old, but the casting director encouraged her to attend the audition anyway and keep her age a secret. Miriam Margolyes appears as Pomona Sprout, Hogwarts' Herbology professor and head of Hufflepuff House. Hugh Mitchell portrays Colin Creevey, a first year student who is a fan of Harry's. Robert Hardy appears as Cornelius Fudge, the Minister for Magic. Toby Jones voices Dobby, a House-elf, while Julian Glover voices Aragog, an acromantula. Jim Norton appears as Mr. Mason and Veronica Clifford appears as Mrs. Mason. Alfred Burke appears as Headmaster Dippet in a memory of Tom Riddle. Daisy Bates, David Tysall and Peter Taylor appear as moving pictures. Helen Stuart plays Millicent Bulstrode, a Slytherin girl.

Hugh Grant was rumoured to be the first choice to play the role of Gilderoy Lockhart, but due to reported scheduling conflicts with Two Weeks Notice, he was unable to play the character. Columbus later denied that Grant had been considered and stated that they had not met. Alan Cumming and Rupert Everett were also considered for Lockhart. Cumming backed out over a salary dispute. Jason Isaacs also auditioned for Lockhart, but was offered for the role of Lucius Malfoy instead. He was reluctant to take the role because he was already signed on to play Captain Hook in Peter Pan (2003), but his family convinced him to take the role and accepted it. Before Coulson was cast as Tom Riddle, James McAvoy and Eddie Redmayne – who later played Newt Scamander in the Fantastic Beasts films – auditioned for the role.

== Production ==
=== Costume and set design ===
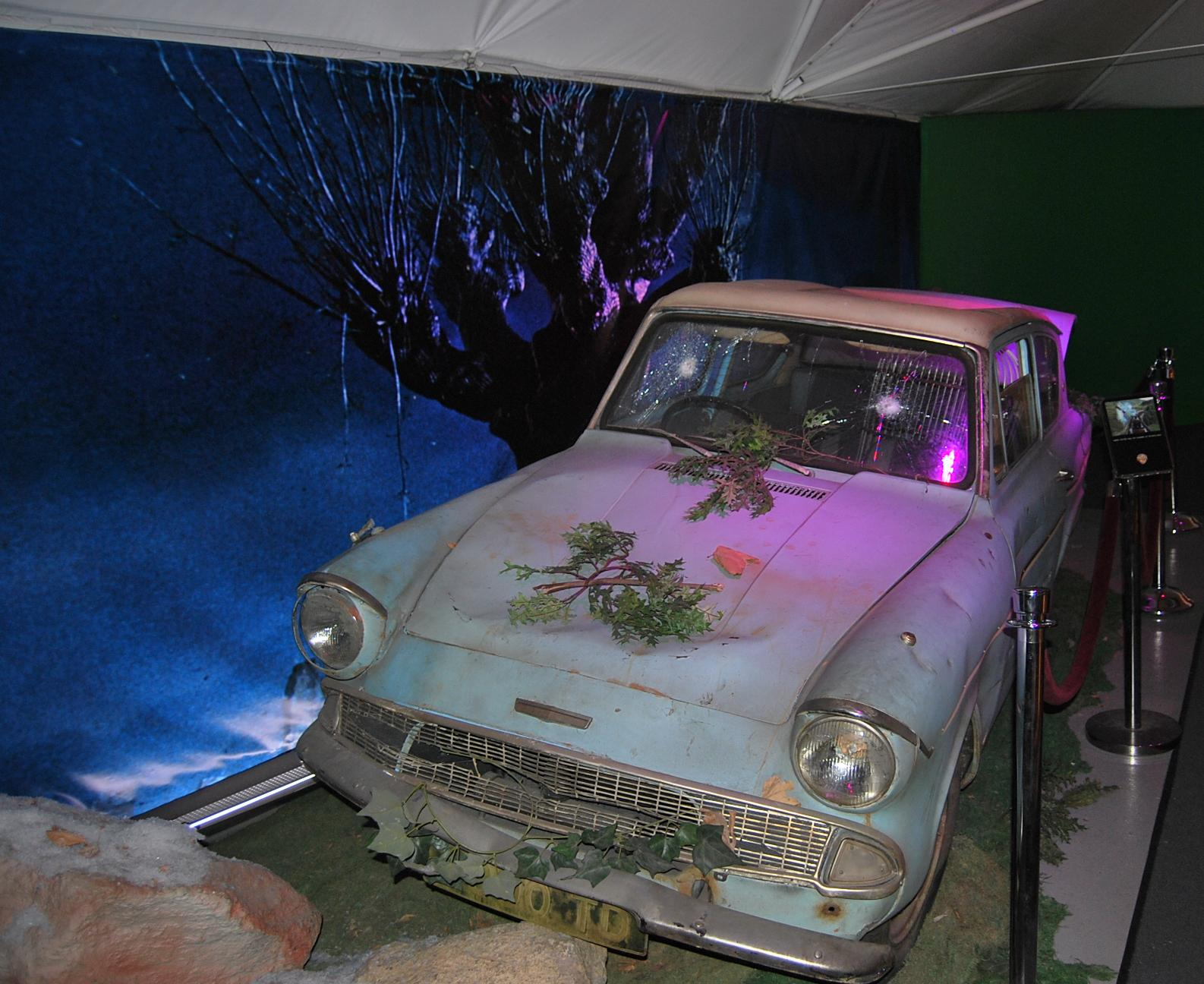
The flying Ford Anglia used in the film

Production designer Stuart Craig returned for the sequel to design new elements previously not seen in the first film. He designed the Burrow based on Arthur Weasley's interest in Muggles, built vertically out of architectural salvage. Mr. Weasley's flying car was created from a 1962 Ford Anglia 105E. The Chamber of Secrets, measuring over 76 metres (249 ft) long and 36.5 metres (119.8 ft) wide, was the biggest set created for the saga. Dumbledore's office, which houses the Sorting Hat and the Sword of Gryffindor, was also built for the film.

Lindy Hemming was the costume designer for Chamber of Secrets. She retained many of the characters' already established appearances, and chose to focus on the new characters introduced in the sequel. Gilderoy Lockhart's wardrobe incorporated bright colours, in contrast with the "dark, muted or sombre colours" of the other characters. Branagh said, "We wanted to create a hybrid between a period dandy and someone who looked as if they could fit into Hogwarts." Hemming also perfected Lucius Malfoy's costume. One of the original concepts was for him to wear a pinstripe suit, but was changed to furs and a snake head cane in order to remark his aristocrat quality and to reflect a "sense of the old."

=== Filming ===
Principal photography began on 19 November 2001, only three days after the wide release of the first film. Second-unit work had started three weeks before, primarily for the flying car scene. Filming took place mainly at Leavesden Film Studios in Hertfordshire, as well as on the Isle of Man. King's Cross railway station was used as the filming location for Platform 9¾, though St Pancras railway station was used for the exterior shots. Gloucester Cathedral was used as the setting for Hogwarts School, along with Durham Cathedral, Alnwick Castle, Lacock Abbey, and the Bodleian Library at the University of Oxford. The Burrow was built in Gypsy Lane, Abbots Langley, in front of Leavesden Studios.

Roger Pratt was brought on as director of photography for Chamber of Secrets, in order to give the film "a darker and edgier feel" than its predecessor, which reflected "the growth of the characters and the story." Director Chris Columbus opted to use handheld cameras to allow more freedom in movement, which he considered "a departure for [him] as a filmmaker." University of Cambridge linguistics professor Francis Nolan created Parseltongue, the language spoken by snakes in the film. Principal photography wrapped in July 2002.

=== Sound design ===
Due to the events that take place in Harry Potter and the Chamber of Secrets, the film's sound effects were much more expansive than in the previous instalment. Sound designer and supervising sound editor Randy Thom returned for the sequel using Pro Tools to complete the job, which included initial conceptions done at Skywalker Sound in California and primary work done at Shepperton Studios in England.

Thom wanted to give the Whomping Willow a voice, a deep growl for which he used his own voice slowed down, equalised and bass-boosted. For the mandrakes, he combined baby cries with female screams, in order to "make it just exotic enough so that you think, 'Hmm, I've never heard anything quite like that before.'"

Thom described the basilisk as a challenge, "because it's a giant snake, but it's also like a dragon — not many snakes have teeth like that. He had to hiss, he had to roar and there were times at the end when he was in pain." He mixed his own voice, tiger roars, and horse and elephant vocalizations.

=== Special and visual effects ===
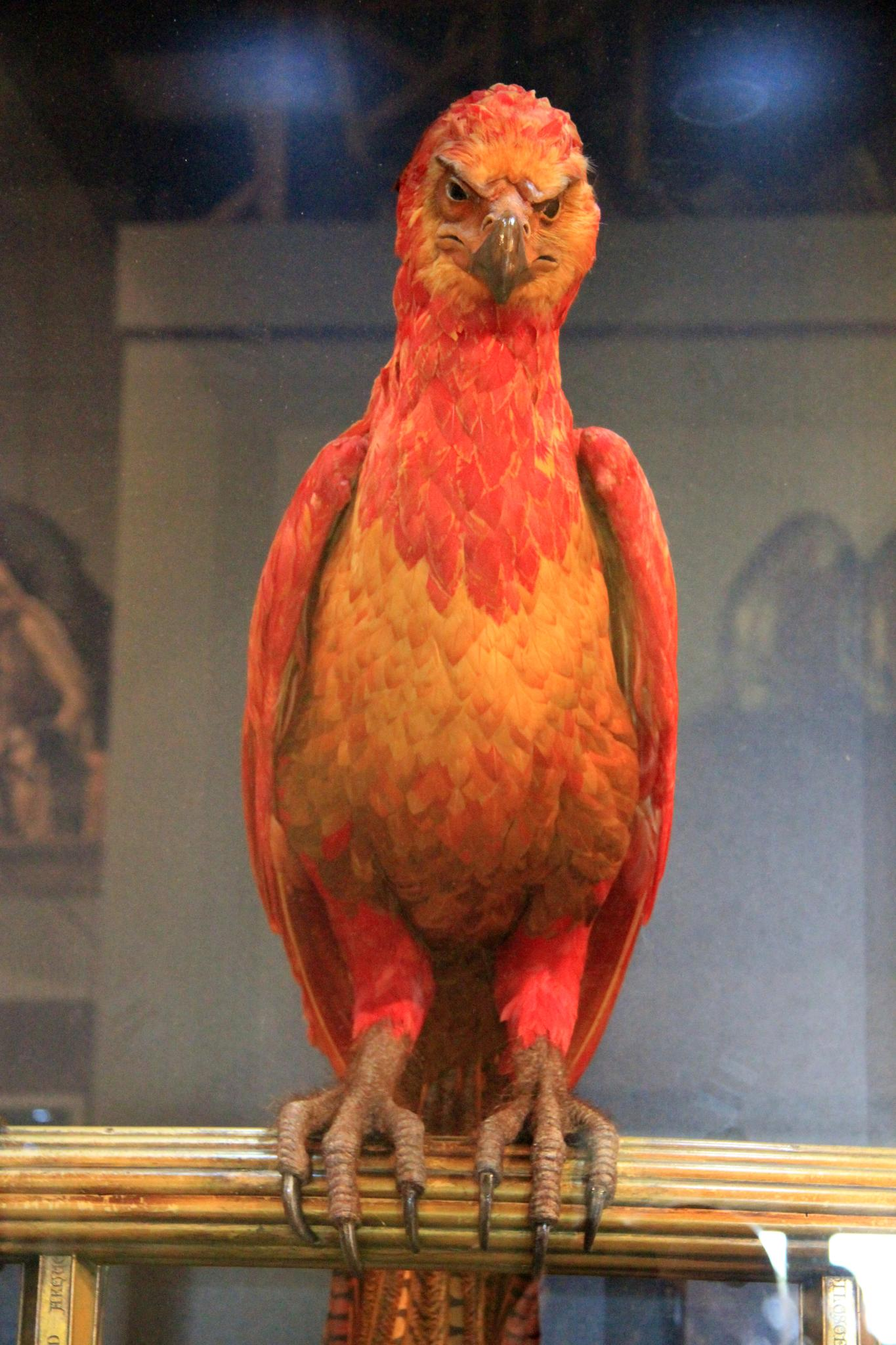
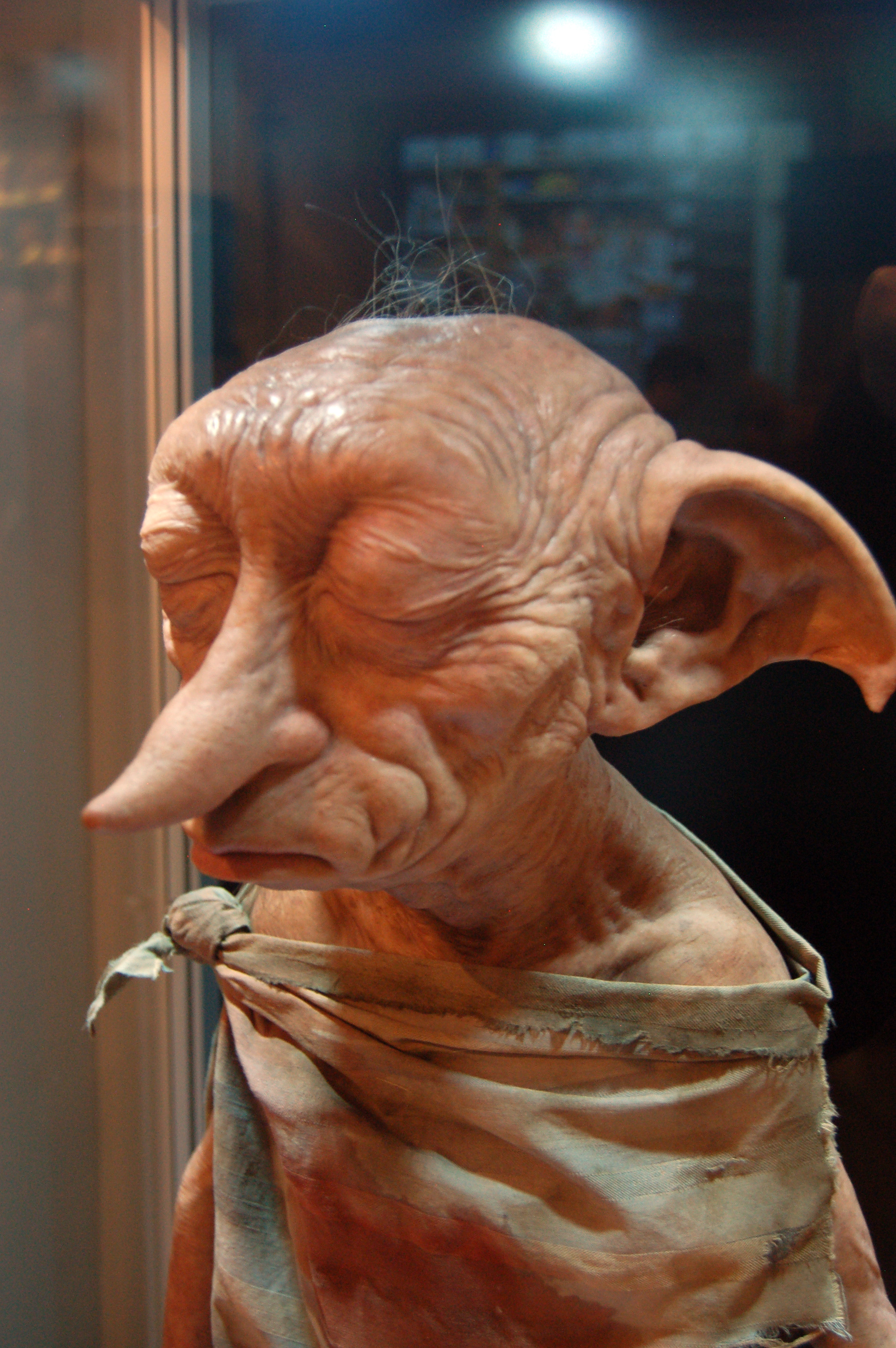
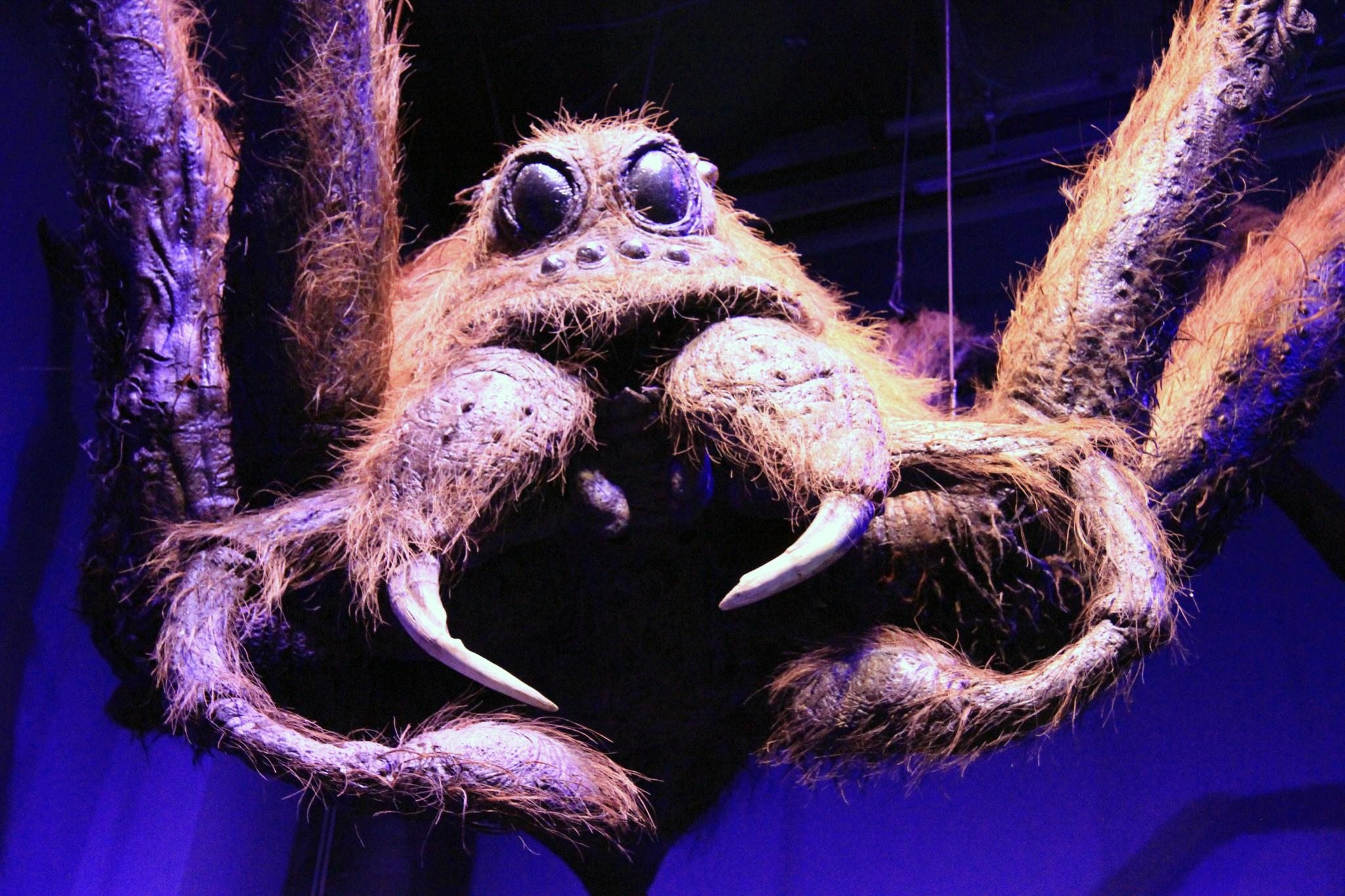
Fawkes the Phoenix, Dobby, and Aragog at the Making of Harry Potter tour in London

Visual effects took nine months to make, until 9 October 2002, when the film was finished. Industrial Light & Magic, Mill Film, the Moving Picture Company (MPC), Cinesite and Framestore CFC handled the approximately 950 visual effect shots in the film. Jim Mitchell and Nick Davis served as visual effects supervisors. They were in charge of creating the CGI characters Dobby the House-elf, the Basilisk and the Cornish pixies, among others. Chas Jarrett from MPC served as CGI supervisor, overseeing the approach of any shot that contains CGI in the film. With a crew of 70 people, the company produced 251 shots, 244 of which made it to the film, from September 2001 to October 2002.

The visual effects team worked alongside creature effects supervisor Nick Dudman, who devised Fawkes the Phoenix, the Mandrakes, Aragog the Acromantula, and the first 25 feet (8 m) of the Basilisk. According to Dudman, Aragog was the most challenging character to create. The giant spider stood 9 feet (3 m) tall with an 18 feet (5 m) foot leg span, each of which had to be controlled by a different team member. The whole creature weighed three quarters of a ton. It took over 15 people to operate the animatronic Aragog on set.

The Whomping Willow sequence required a combination of practical and visual effects. Special effects supervisor John Richardson and his team created mechanically operated branches to hit the flying car. A 1:3 scale set was built on stage at Shepperton Studios, which featured the fully-sized top third of the tree with a forced perspective to appear a height of over 100 feet (30 m) high. The courtyard and the tree were built in 3D. Some shots ended up being entirely digital. Jarret identified the rendering as "the biggest challenge" of the scene, because "there was just so much going on in [it] ... It was simply massive."

=== Music ===
John Williams, who composed the previous film's score, returned to score Harry Potter and the Chamber of Secrets. Composing the film proved to be a difficult task, as Williams had just completed scoring Attack of the Clones and Minority Report when work was scheduled to begin on Catch Me If You Can. Because of this, William Ross was brought in to arrange themes from the Philosopher's Stone into the new material that Williams was composing whenever he had the chance. Ross also conducted the scoring sessions with the London Symphony Orchestra. The soundtrack album was released on 12 November 2002.

== Distribution ==
=== Marketing ===
Footage for the film began appearing online in the summer of 2002, with a teaser trailer debuting in cinemas with the release of Scooby-Doo that June. A video game based on the film was released in early November 2002 by Electronic Arts for several consoles, including GameCube, PlayStation 2, and Xbox. The film also continued the merchandising success set by its predecessor, with reports of shortages on Lego's Chamber of Secrets tie-ins.

=== Home media ===
The film was originally released in the United Kingdom, United States and Canada on 11 April 2003 on both VHS and in a two-disc special edition fullscreen/widescreen DVD digipack, which included extended and deleted scenes and interviews. On 11 December 2007, the film was released on Blu-ray. An Ultimate Edition of the film was released on 8 December 2009, featuring new footage, TV spots, an extended version of the film with deleted scenes edited in, and a feature-length special Creating the World of Harry Potter Part 2: Characters. The film's extended version has a running time of about 174 minutes, which has previously been shown during certain television airings.

== Reception ==
=== Box office ===
Harry Potter and the Chamber of Secrets held its world premiere at Odeon Leicester Square on 3 November 2002, and was released in the United Kingdom and the United States on 15 November 2002. The film broke multiple records upon its opening. In the United States and Canada, the film opened to an $88.4 million opening weekend, playing on 8,515 screens at 3,682 theaters, making it the third-largest opening at the time, behind Spider-Man and its predecessor Harry Potter and the Philosopher's Stone. The film would hold the record for having the largest number of screenings until it was surpassed by X2 the next year. It was also No. 1 at the box office for two non-consecutive weekends. Harry Potter and the Chamber of Secrets was the second 2002 film to return to the number one spot, just after Mel Gibson's Signs. The film joined Die Another Day and The Santa Clause 2 to outperform the weak opening of Treasure Planet. Both Harry Potter and the Chamber of Secrets and Die Another Day were the most recent films to reclaim the number one spot for six months until June 2003 when Finding Nemo became the next film to do so. In the United Kingdom, the film broke all opening records that were previously held by Philosopher's Stone. It made £18.9 million during its opening including previews and £10.9 million excluding previews. It went on to make £54.8 million in the UK; at the time, the fifth-biggest tally of all time in the region.

Internationally, the film earned $59.5 million during its opening weekend. The film earned $3.7 million in Japan, making it the highest opening of any film in the country until it was surpassed a year later by The Matrix Reloaded. In Malaysia, Harry Potter and the Chamber of Secrets made a total of $474,000, breaking Eraser's record for having the country's biggest opening for any Warner Bros. Pictures film. It would go on to generate a total of $1.03 million in Singapore, becoming the second-highest film opening in the country, after The Lost World: Jurassic Park. Meanwhile, the film earned $3.1 million in Taiwan, surpassing The Mummy Returns by 16%. Harry Potter and the Chamber of Secrets would then gross over $1.15 million in the Philippines, ranking as an industry high in the country only 5% bigger than Godzilla. The film made a total of $879.8 million worldwide in its original release and $926.2 million after re-releases. It was the second-highest-grossing film of 2002 worldwide behind The Lord of the Rings: The Two Towers, and the fourth highest-grossing film in the US and Canada that year with $262.6 million behind Spider-Man, The Two Towers, and Star Wars: Episode II – Attack of the Clones. However, it was the year's number one film outside of America, making $617.2 million compared to The Two Towers' $584.5 million.

=== Critical response ===
On Rotten Tomatoes, the film has an approval rating of 82% based on 237 reviews, with an average rating of 7.2/10. The site's critical consensus reads, "Though perhaps more enchanting for younger audiences, Chamber of Secrets is nevertheless both darker and livelier than its predecessor, expanding and improving upon the first film's universe." On Metacritic, the film has a weighted average score of 63 out of 100, based on 35 critics, indicating "generally favorable" reviews. Audiences polled by CinemaScore gave the film a rare "A+", the only film in the Harry Potter series to receive such grade.

Roger Ebert gave The Chamber of Secrets 4 out of 4 stars, especially praising the set design. Entertainment Weekly commended the film for being better and darker than its predecessor: "And among the things this Harry Potter does very well indeed is deepen the darker, more frightening atmosphere for audiences. This is as it should be: Harry's story is supposed to get darker". Richard Roeper praised Columbus' direction and the film's faithfulness to the book, saying: "Chris Columbus, the director, does a real wonderful job of being faithful to the story but also taking it into a cinematic era". Variety said the film was excessively long, but praised it for being darker and more dramatic, saying that its confidence and intermittent flair to give it a life of its own apart from the books was something The Philosopher's Stone never achieved. The Guardian praised the darker storyline, but said that the acting could have been better.

A. O. Scott from The New York Times said: "instead of feeling stirred you may feel battered and worn down, but not, in the end, too terribly disappointed". Peter Travers from Rolling Stone condemned the film for being over-long and too faithful to the book: "Once again, director Chris Columbus takes a hat-in-hand approach to Rowling that stifles creativity and allows the film to drag on for nearly three hours". Kenneth Turan from the Los Angeles Times called the film a cliché which is "deja vu all over again, it's likely that whatever you thought of the first production – pro or con – you'll likely think of this one".

=== Accolades ===
Chamber of Secrets was nominated for three BAFTA Awards: Best Production Design, Best Sound, and Best Special Visual Effects. The film was also nominated for six Saturn Awards. It received two nominations at the inaugural Visual Effects Society Awards. The Broadcast Film Critics Association granted it the Best Family Film and Best Composer awards, and nominated it for Best Digital Acting Performance (for Toby Jones).

Award	Date of ceremony	Category	Recipients	Result	Ref.
Amanda Awards	22 August 2003	Best Foreign Feature Film	Harry Potter and the Chamber of Secrets	Nominated	
Bogey Awards	2002	Bogey Award in Platinum	Harry Potter and the Chamber of Secrets	Won	
British Academy Film Awards	23 February 2003	Best Production Design	Stuart Craig	Nominated	
British Academy Film Awards	23 February 2003	Best Sound	Randy Thom, Dennis Leonard, John Midgley, Ray Merrin, Graham Daniel and Rick Kline	Nominated	
British Academy Film Awards	23 February 2003	Best Special Visual Effects	Jim Mitchell, Nick Davis, John Richardson, Bill George and Nick Dudman	Nominated	
British Academy Children's Awards	30 November 2003	BAFTA Kids' Vote	Harry Potter and the Chamber of Secrets	Won	
Broadcast Film Critics Association Award	17 January 2003	Best Family Film	Harry Potter and the Chamber of Secrets	Won	
Broadcast Film Critics Association Award	17 January 2003	Best Composer	John Williams	Won	
Broadcast Film Critics Association Award	17 January 2003	Best Digital Acting Performance	Toby Jones	Nominated	
Broadcast Music Incorporated Film & TV Awards	14 May 2003	BMI Film Music Award	John Williams	Won	
Golden Reel Awards	22 March 2003	Best Sound Editing – Foreign Film	Randy Thom, Dennis Leonard, Derek Trigg, Martin Cantwell, Andy Kennedy, Colin Ritchie, Nick Lowe	Nominated	
GoldSpirit Awards	2003	Best Recording Edition	John Williams	bronze	
GoldSpirit Awards	2003	Best Sci-Fi/Fantasy Theme	John Williams	bronze	
Grammy Awards	8 February 2004	Best Score Soundtrack Album for a Motion Picture, Television or Other Visual Media	John Williams	Nominated	
Hugo Awards	28 August–1 September 2003	Best Dramatic Presentation, Long Form	Harry Potter and the Chamber of Secrets	Nominated	
Japan Academy Film Prize	7 March 2003	Outstanding Foreign Language Film	Harry Potter and the Chamber of Secrets	Nominated	
Nickelodeon Kids' Choice Awards	12 April 2003	Favorite Movie	Harry Potter and the Chamber of Secrets	Nominated	
London Film Critics Circle	12 February 2003	British Supporting Actor of the Year	Kenneth Branagh	Won	
MTV Movie Awards	31 May 2003	Best Virtual Performance	Toby Jones	Nominated	
Online Film Critics Society	6 January 2003	Best Visual Effects	John Richardson	Nominated	
Saturn Awards	18 May 2003	Best Fantasy Film	Harry Potter and the Chamber of Secrets	Nominated	
Saturn Awards	18 May 2003	Best Performance by a Younger Actor	Daniel Radcliffe	Nominated	
Saturn Awards	18 May 2003	Best Direction	Chris Columbus	Nominated	
Saturn Awards	18 May 2003	Best Costume	Lindy Hemming	Nominated	
Saturn Awards	18 May 2003	Best Make-up	Nick Dudman, Amanda Knight	Nominated	
Saturn Awards	18 May 2003	Best Special Effects	John Mitchell, Nick Davis, John Richardson, Bill George	Nominated	
Stinkers Bad Movie Awards	16 March 2003	Most Annoying Non-Human Character	Dobby the House Elf	Nominated	
Visual Effects Society	19 February 2003	Best Character Animation in a Live Action Motion Picture	"Dobby's Face" – David Andrews, Steve Rawlins, Frank Gravatt, Douglas Smythe	Nominated	
Visual Effects Society	19 February 2003	Best Compositing in a Motion Picture	"Quidditch Match" – Dorne Huebler, Barbara Brennan, Jay Cooper, Kimberly Lashbrook	Nominated	

== See also ==
- List of films about witchcraft
