= Star Wars: Episode II – Attack of the Clones (soundtrack) =

Star Wars Episode II: Attack of the Clones (Original Motion Picture Soundtrack)

Film score by John Williams
- Released: April 23, 2002
- Recorded: January 2002
- Studios: Abbey Road Studios, London
- Genre: Classical
- Length: 73:43
- Label: Sony Classical
- Producer: John Williams

John Williams chronology
Harry Potter and the Philosopher's Stone (2001)	Star Wars Episode II: Attack of the Clones (Original Motion Picture Soundtrack) (2002)	Minority Report (2002)

Professional ratings
Review scores
Source	Rating
AllMusic	3/5 stars
Empire	5/5 stars
Film Score Reviews	4/5 stars
Filmtracks	5/5 stars
Movie Wave	5/5 stars
Score Sounds	9/10 stars
SoundtrackNet	3.5/5 stars
Tracksounds	8/10 stars

The soundtrack to Star Wars: Episode II – Attack of the Clones was released by Sony Classical on April 23, 2002. The music was composed and conducted by John Williams, and performed by the London Symphony Orchestra and London Voices in January 2002, with orchestrations provided by Conrad Pope and Eddie Karam. Shawn Murphy recorded and mixed the score. Peter Myles and Kenneth Wannberg served as music editors. Williams himself produced the recording sessions.

The album had four alternate covers, each sold separately, that featured Anakin and Padme, Jango Fett, Yoda, and the theatrical poster art by Drew Struzan. For a limited time, a Walmart retail exclusive version of the CD had bonus enhanced multimedia CD-ROM content when inserted into a computer featuring a link to an exclusive PC screensaver. A Target-exclusive edition featured the bonus track "On the Conveyor Belt". Best Buy versions of the album included a limited edition Episode II Trading Card. A remastered version of the soundtrack was released by Walt Disney Records on May 4, 2018.

== Track listing ==
No.	Title	Length
1.	"Star Wars Main Title and Ambush on Coruscant"	3:46
2.	"Across the Stars (Love Theme from Attack of the Clones)"	5:33
3.	"Zam the Assassin and The Chase Through Coruscant"	11:07
4.	"Yoda and the Younglings"	3:55
5.	"Departing Coruscant"	1:44
6.	"Anakin and Padmé"	3:57
7.	"Jango's Escape"	3:48
8.	"The Meadow Picnic"	4:14
9.	"Bounty Hunter's Pursuit"	3:23
10.	"Return to Tatooine"	6:57
11.	"The Tusken Camp and The Homestead"	5:54
12.	"Love Pledge and the Arena"	8:29
13.	"Confrontation with Count Dooku and Finale"	10:45
14.	"On the Conveyor Belt" (Target exclusive bonus track)	3:02

For the US release, early album prints titled track 2 as only "Love Theme from Attack of the Clones" on the album's back and insert. Later releases re-named the track to "Across the Stars (Love Theme from Attack of the Clones)". This was not the case for the international versions.

The Target-exclusive bonus track, "On the Conveyor Belt", is not included on the 2018 release by Walt Disney Records.

== Recording Information ==
Certain cues used in the film contain inserts that replace a portion of the intended cue. Both the Main Title and End Credit introduction recordings were taken from The Phantom Menace. Due to the editing in the film, several effects were used to aid in transitions between edited cues. Several moments use a chime sound such as the transition from the Obi-Wan Kamino moments to the Anakin/Padmé Naboo scenes. "Entrance of the Monsters", for example, is almost completely tracked out and is instead replaced with "source" crowd sounds such as drums. Once the Battle of Geonosis begins, the editing becomes extensive, pulling from both The Phantom Menace and Attack of the Clones, utilizing all forms of editing and supplementing transitions with timpani rolls. The complete score with the inserts and edits has never been officially released.

=== Cue List ===
- 1M1 Main Title (The Phantom Menace Recording)
- 1M2 The Arrival at Coruscant (January 24, 2002)
- 1M3 Thwarted Attempt (January 18, 2002)
- 1M4 The Meeting of Anakin and Padme (January 19, 2002)
- 1M5 She Hardly Recognized Me (January 20, 2002)
- 1M6 Zam's Dirty Trick (January 24, 2002)
- 1M7A Zam's Chase Pt. 1 (January 19, 2002)
- 1M7B Zam in Pursuit (January 23, 2002)
- 2M1 Zam is Eliminated (January 24, 2002)
- 2M2 Palpatine's Plotting (January 24, 2002)
- 2M3 Departure (January 19, 2002)
- 2M4 Cafe Scene* (Not Assigned)
- 2M5 The Library Scene (January 21, 2002)
- 2M6 Lunch and the Younglings (January 20, 2002)
- 2M7 Approaching Naboo Palace (January 19, 2002)
- 3M1 Finding Kamino (January 21, 2002)
- 3M1 Insert (January 23, 2002)
- 3M2 Visiting the Prime Minister (January 18, 2002)
- 3M3 The First Kiss (January 18, 2002)
- 3M4 Interior Tipoca City (January 21, 2002)
- 3M5 The Meadow Scene (Not Recorded)
- 3M5R The Meadow Scene (January 23, 2002)
- 3M6 The Meeting With Fett (January 26, 2002)
- 3M7 The Dinner Scene (January 18, 2002)
- 3M8 Rainy Ramp and Anakin's Nightmare (January 26, 2002)
- 3M9 [Anakin Thinks of His Mother* **] (Tracked)
- 4M1 The Jango Fett Fight (January 23, 2002)
- 4M2 Watto Describes Mothers Fate (January 19, 2002)
- 4M3 The Spare Canister Caper (January 24, 2002)
- 4M4 The Arrival at Tatooine (January 20, 2002)
- 4M5 Obi-Wan Eavesdropping (January 26, 2002)
- 4M6 Rescuing Mother (January 21, 2002)
- 4M7 Exacting Revenge (January 21, 2002)
- 5M1A Carrying Mother Home (January 20, 2002)
- 5M1B Anakin Changes (January 20, 2002)
- 5M2 Smee's Funeral (January 26, 2002)
- 5M3 The Commerce Guild Prepares For War (January 21, 2002)
- 5M4(A) [Dooku Talks to Obi-Wan**] (Tracked)
- 5M4(B) [Going to Rescue Obi-Wan* **] (Tracked)
- 5M5 Finding the Conveyor Belt (January 21, 2002)
- 5M6 The Conveyor Belt (January 19, 2002)
- 5M6 Insert (January 24, 2002)
- 5M7 The Senate Scene (January 24, 2002)
- 6M1 Love Pledge (January 19, 2002)
- 6M2 Entrance of the Monsters (January 21, 2002)
- 6M2 Sweetner (January 21, 2002)
- 6M3 [Battle Part I*] (Tracked)
- 6M4 [Battle Part II*] (Tracked)
- 6M5 Padme Falls (January 18, 2002)
- 6M5 Insert (January 24, 2002)
- 7M1 Dooku Versus Obi-Wan (January 26, 2002)
- 7M2 Yoda Strikes Back (January 20, 2002)
- 7M3 Finale (January 20, 2002)
- 7M3 Insert (January 24, 2002)
- End Credits (January 18, 2002)
- EC "Updated Gelb Version" (January 23, 2002)
- End Credits - CD Version (Not Recorded)
- End Credits - Gelb Version (Not Recorded)

*Title from GEMA Repertoire **Title from BMI

== Charts ==
Chart performance for Star Wars: Episode II – Attack of the Clones soundtrack
Chart (2002)	Peak position
Australian Albums (ARIA)	17
Austrian Albums (Ö3 Austria)	12
Belgian Albums (Ultratop Flanders)	35
Belgian Albums (Ultratop Wallonia)	30
Canadian Albums (Billboard)	12
Dutch Albums (Album Top 100)	68
French Albums (SNEP)	19
German Albums (Offizielle Top 100)	14
Hungarian Albums (MAHASZ)	9
Irish Albums (IRMA)	27
Swiss Albums (Schweizer Hitparade)	30
UK Albums (Official Charts)	15
US Billboard 200	6

== Certifications ==
Certifications for Star Wars: Episode II – Attack of the Clones soundtrack
Region	Certification	Certified units/sales
Germany (BVMI)	Gold	150,000^{‡}
United States (RIAA)	Gold	500,000^{^}
^{^} Shipments figures based on certification alone.^{‡} Sales+streaming figures based on certification alone.
