= Harry Potter and the Philosopher's Stone (soundtrack) =

Harry Potter and the Philosopher's Stone (Original Motion Picture Soundtrack)

Soundtrack album by John Williams
- Released: 30 October 2001
- Recorded: August – September 2001
- Studios: AIR Lyndhurst Hall (London); Abbey Road (London)
- Length: 73:35
- Labels: Warner/Sunset; Nonesuch; Atlantic

John Williams chronology
A.I. Artificial Intelligence (2001)	Harry Potter and the Philosopher's Stone (Original Motion Picture Soundtrack) (2001)	Star Wars Episode II: Attack of the Clones (2002)

The soundtrack to Harry Potter and the Philosopher's Stone (titled Harry Potter and the Sorcerer's Stone in the United States) was released on 30 October 2001. The film's score was composed and conducted by John Williams. The soundtrack was nominated for Best Original Score at the 74th Academy Awards. The film introduces many character-specific themes (leitmotifs) that are used in at least one sequel as well, although most of the themes are only used again in Chamber of Secrets. These themes include two themes for Voldemort, two themes for Hogwarts, a Diagon Alley theme, a Quidditch theme, a flying theme, two friendship themes, and the main theme ("Hedwig's Theme"). This main theme was reprised and developed in all eight of the main Harry Potter films, as well as the spinoff films Fantastic Beasts and Where to Find Them and its sequels, Fantastic Beasts: The Crimes of Grindelwald and Fantastic Beasts: The Secrets of Dumbledore.

The soundtrack was certified gold in Canada (50,000 units) by the Canadian Recording Industry Association on 14 December 2001. It was also certified gold in Japan for 100,000 units by the RIAJ. In 2002, the soundtrack was nominated for Best Original Score at the 74th Academy Awards in which Williams took part in conducting the ceremony. However, Williams lost to Howard Shore's score of The Lord of the Rings: The Fellowship of the Ring.

The score was performed by a 102-piece of the London Session Orchestra at AIR Lyndhurst Studios and Abbey Road Studios in London with orchestrations provided by Williams, Alexander Courage, Conrad Pope, John Neufeld, Eddie Karam, Pete Anthony, Benjamin Wallfisch and Larry Rench. It entered the Billboard 200 at No. 48 and also charted at No. 2 on the Top Soundtracks Chart. In UK, the album charted at number 19. In 2018, the soundtrack was released by La-La-Land Records as a 3-Disc CD set encompassing the complete score of the film as part of a limited edition box set featuring the scores for the first three Harry Potter films.

== Composition ==
=== Hedwig's Theme ===
"Hedwig's Theme"
A selection from the iconic "Hedwig's Theme" from the Harry Potter films

"Hedwig's Theme" is the leitmotif for the film series. Often labelled as the series's main theme, it first appeared in Harry Potter and the Philosopher's Stone in the track "Prologue". A concert arrangement of the same name is included in the end credits. "Hedwig's Theme" has been interpolated in the fourth through eighth Harry Potter film scores, including in those by Patrick Doyle, Nicholas Hooper, and Alexandre Desplat and the spin-off Fantastic Beasts scores by James Newton Howard. It also appears in the scores to the last four Harry Potter video games, all composed by James Hannigan. "Hedwig's Theme" has achieved significant pop culture status, being featured as ring tones, trailer music, and other forms of multimedia.

== Track listing ==
=== Original release ===
No.	Title	Length
1.	"Prologue (contains Hedwig's Theme)"	2:12
2.	"Harry's Wondrous World (contains Hedwig's Theme)"	5:21
3.	"The Arrival of Baby Harry (contains Hedwig's Theme)"	4:25
4.	"Visit to the Zoo and Letters from Hogwarts (contains Hedwig's Theme)"	3:23
5.	"Diagon Alley and The Gringotts Vault"	4:06
6.	"Platform Nine-and-Three-Quarters and The Journey to Hogwarts (contains Hedwig's Theme)"	3:14
7.	"Entry into the Great Hall and The Banquet"	3:42
8.	"Mr. Longbottom Flies"	3:35
9.	"Hogwarts Forever! and The Moving Stairs (contains Hedwig's Theme)"	3:47
10.	"The Norwegian Ridgeback and A Change of Season"	2:47
11.	"The Quidditch Match (contains Hedwig's Theme)"	8:29
12.	"Christmas at Hogwarts"	2:56
13.	"The Invisibility Cloak and The Library Scene (contains Hedwig's Theme)"	3:16
14.	"Fluffy's Harp"	2:39
15.	"In the Devil's Snare and The Flying Keys"	2:21
16.	"The Chess Game"	3:49
17.	"The Face of Voldemort"	6:10
18.	"Leaving Hogwarts (contains Hedwig's Theme)"	2:14
19.	"Hedwig's Theme"	5:11
Total length:		73:28

=== Harry Potter - The John Williams Soundtrack Collection: Disc 1 ===
The Film Score
No.	Title	Length
1.	"The Prologue – Privet Drive (contains Hedwig's Theme)"	4:33
2.	"Visit to the Zoo (contains Hedwig's Theme)"	3:01
3.	"Don't Burn My Letter (contains Hedwig's Theme)"	2:08
4.	"Letters From Hogwarts (contains Hedwig's Theme)"	1:43
5.	"Harry's Wish and Hagrid's Entrance (contains Hedwig's Theme)"	1:24
6.	"You're a Wizard, Harry (contains Hedwig's Theme)"	3:34
7.	"Diagon Alley and The Gringotts Vault [Extended Version] (contains Hedwig's Theme)"	4:50
8.	"Harry Gets His Wand"	2:08
9.	"Hagrid's Flashback (contains Hedwig's Theme)"	2:53
10.	"Platform Nine and Three Quarters (contains Hedwig's Theme)"	2:43
11.	"Chocolate Frog Escapes"	0:52
12.	"The Journey to Hogwarts (contains Hedwig's Theme)"	2:07
13.	"Through the Doors"	2:01
14.	"House Selection (contains Hedwig's Theme)"	3:31
15.	"Entry Into the Great Hall and The Banquet"	3:44
16.	"Lonely First Night"	1:08
17.	"The Daily Prophet (contains Hedwig's Theme)"	1:41
18.	"Mr. Longbottom Flies"	3:37
19.	"The Moving Stairs (contains Hedwig's Theme)"	2:01
20.	"Introduction to Quidditch"	1:35
21.	"Hermione's Feather"	0:37
22.	"Fighting the Troll (contains Hedwig's Theme)"	3:49
23.	"Owl Delivers Nimbus 2000 (contains Hedwig's Theme)"	1:16
24.	"The Quidditch Match (contains Hedwig's Theme)"	8:29

=== Harry Potter - The John Williams Soundtrack Collection: Disc 2 ===
The Film Score (continued)
No.	Title	Length
1.	"Hagrid's Christmas Tree"	0:59
2.	"Cast a Christmas Spell"	2:41
3.	"Christmas Morning and The Invisibility Cloak (contains Hedwig's Theme)"	7:22
4.	"The Mirror of Erised and A Change of Season"	3:35
5.	"Hermione's Reading"	1:11
6.	"The Norwegian Ridgeback"	1:41
7.	"Filch's Fond Remembrance"	1:31
8.	"The Dark Forest"	5:17
9.	"The Stone"	3:41
10.	"Running to McGonagall (contains Hedwig's Theme)"	2:16
11.	"Neville Stiffens (contains Hedwig's Theme)"	0:57
12.	"Fluffy's Harp Lullaby"	2:30
13.	"In the Devil's Snare"	2:29
14.	"The Flying Keys"	2:01
15.	"The Chess Game [Extended Version] (contains Hedwig's Theme)"	7:27
16.	"The Face of Voldemort (contains Hedwig's Theme)"	6:13
17.	"Love, Harry (contains Hedwig's Theme)"	1:47
18.	"Gryffindor Wins the House Cup"	2:40
19.	"Leaving Hogwarts (contains Hedwig's Theme)"	2:18
20.	"Harry's Wondrous World [Extended Version] (contains Hedwig's Theme)"	5:26
21.	"Hedwig's Theme"	5:07

=== Harry Potter - The John Williams Soundtrack Collection: Disc 3 ===
Children's Suite for Orchestra
No.	Title	Length
1.	"Prologue (Hedwig's Flight) (contains Hedwig's Theme)"	2:15
2.	"Hogwarts Forever"	1:55
3.	"Voldemort"	2:16
4.	"Nimbus 2000"	2:28
5.	"Fluffy's Harp"	2:42
6.	"Quidditch"	1:53
7.	"Family Portrait"	3:26
8.	"Diagon Alley"	2:53
9.	"Harry's Wondrous World (contains Hedwig's Theme)"	5:05

Additional Music
No.	Title	Length
10.	"Hagrid's Flute (contains Hedwig's Theme)"	0:58
11.	"The Leaky Cauldron"	1:15
12.	"Hedwig's Theme for Harp (contains Hedwig's Theme)"	2:06
13.	"Teaser (contains Hedwig's Theme)"	2:34
14.	"Hogwarts Forever [Vocal Version]"	0:48
15.	"Logo (contains Hedwig's Theme)"	0:24
16.	"Owl's Flight"	1:08
17.	"Television Commercial (contains Hedwig's Theme)"	1:06
18.	"Trailer (contains Hedwig's Theme)"	2:27

== Critical reception ==
Professional ratings
Review scores
Source	Rating
AllMusic	4/5 stars
Filmtracks	5/5 stars
Movie Wave	3.5/5 stars
Tracksounds	4/5 stars

Whilst the score received mostly positive reviews from outlets such as AllMusic and Filmtracks, some reviewers were unimpressed; USA Today reviewer Claudia Puig stated the "overly insistent score lacks subtlety and bludgeons us with crescendos." Kirk Honeycutt of The Hollywood Reporter deemed the score "a great clanging, banging music box that simply will not shut up."

== Behind the scenes ==
James Horner was approached to compose the score for the film but he turned it down.

Track No. 18 is also included in the epilogue of Harry Potter and the Deathly Hallows – Part 2 as a tribute to Williams and the series' end.

== Charts ==
Weekly chart performance for Harry Potter And The Philosopher's Stone
Chart (2001–2026)	Peak position
Hungarian Physical Albums (MAHASZ)	25
US Billboard 200	48
US Soundtrack Albums (Billboard)	2
US Top Classical Albums (Billboard)	1
US Top Classical Crossover Albums (Billboard)	1

== Certifications and sales ==
Region	Certification	Certified units/sales
Australia (ARIA)	Gold	35,000^{^}
^{^} Shipments figures based on certification alone.
