= Catch Me If You Can (soundtrack) =

Catch Me If You Can: Music from the Motion Picture

Film score by John Williams
- Released: December 10, 2002
- Studio: Sony Pictures Studios
- Genre: Soundtrack
- Length: 62:26
- Label: DreamWorks Records
- Producer: John Williams

John Williams chronology
Harry Potter and the Chamber of Secrets (2002)	Catch Me If You Can: Music from the Motion Picture (2002)	Harry Potter and the Prisoner of Azkaban (2004)

Professional ratings
Review scores
Source	Rating
AllMusic	3/5 stars
Empire	3/5 stars
Filmtracks	3/5 stars
Movie Wave	3/5 stars
SoundtrackNet	3/5 stars
Tracksounds	8/10 stars

Catch Me If You Can: Music from the Motion Picture is the original soundtrack of the 2002 film of the same name, starring Leonardo DiCaprio, Tom Hanks, Christopher Walken, Martin Sheen and Amy Adams. The original score was composed and conducted by John Williams and performed by the Hollywood Studio Symphony. The film was the twentieth collaboration between Williams and director Steven Spielberg.

The album was also produced by John Williams. It was nominated for the Academy Award for Best Original Score and the Grammy Award for Best Score Soundtrack for Visual Media.

== In popular culture ==
The first track of the soundtrack is featured in The Simpsons episode "Catch 'Em If You Can".

== Track listing ==
All music composed and conducted by John Williams unless otherwise stated.

Catch Me If You Can: Music from the Motion Picture
No.	Title	Music	Performer(s)	Length
1.	"Catch Me If You Can"			2:41
2.	"The Float"			4:56
3.	"Come Fly with Me"		Frank Sinatra	3:19
4.	"Recollections (The Father's Theme)"		Soloists: Alan Estes, vibraphone; Dan Higgins, saxophone	5:16
5.	"The Airport Scene"			2:26
6.	"The Girl from Ipanema"		Stan Getz and João Gilberto featuring Astrud Gilberto and Antonio Carlos Jobim	5:15
7.	"Learning the Ropes"			8:44
8.	"Father and Son"		Soloists: Alan Estes, vibraphone; Dan Higgins, saxophone	3:15
9.	"Embraceable You"		Judy Garland and Victor Young and His Orchestra	2:50
10.	"The Flash Comics Clue"			1:47
11.	"Deadheading"			2:25
12.	"The Christmas Song (Merry Christmas to You)"		Nat King Cole	3:10
13.	"A Broken Home"			4:25
14.	"Un Poco Adagio"	Haydn Concerto for Piano and Strings, No 11 in D-Major by Franz Joseph Haydn		3:12
15.	"The Look of Love"		Dusty Springfield	3:31
16.	"Catch Me If You Can (Reprise and End Credits)"			5:14
Total length:				62:26
