= Harry Potter and the Prisoner of Azkaban (soundtrack) =

Harry Potter and the Prisoner of Azkaban (Original Motion Picture Soundtrack)

Film score by John Williams
- Released: 25 May 2004
- Recorded: March 2004
- Studio: Abbey Road Studios
- Genre: Soundtrack
- Length: 68:37
- Labels: Warner/Sunset; Nonesuch; Atlantic
- Producer: John Williams

John Williams chronology
Catch Me If You Can (2002)	Harry Potter and the Prisoner of Azkaban (Original Motion Picture Soundtrack) (2004)	The Terminal (2004)

Professional ratings
Review scores
Source	Rating
AllMusic	4.5/5 stars
Empire	4/5 stars
Filmtracks	4/5 stars
Movie Wave	4.5/5 stars
SoundtrackNet	4/5 stars

Harry Potter and the Prisoner of Azkaban (Original Motion Picture Soundtrack) is the film score for the 2004 film of the same name, the third and final score in the series to be composed and conducted by John Williams. The soundtrack was performed at Abbey Road Studios in London with various freelance musicians, with the London Voices and the London Oratory School Schola providing vocal performances. The score was orchestrated by Conrad Pope and Eddie Karam. The soundtrack is a significant departure from the previous two, since the director, Alfonso Cuarón, wanted the music to take a different approach. It introduced three major themes: "Window to the Past", "Double Trouble", and "Buckbeak's Flight". Other repeating new motifs were composed for the Time-Turner, Peter Pettigrew, and Sirius Black's hunt for Harry. It was released on 25 May 2004 and charted at No. 68 on the Billboard 200 and also charted at No. 3 on the Top Soundtracks Chart.

The album was nominated for the Academy Award for Best Original Score, the Grammy Award for Best Score Soundtrack for Visual Media, and the World Soundtrack Award for Best Original Score of the Year. In 2018, the soundtrack was released by La-La-Land Records as a 2-Disc CD set encompassing the complete score of the film as part of a limited-edition box set featuring the scores for the first three Harry Potter films.

== Track listing ==
=== Original release ===
All music is composed by John Williams.

No.	Title	Length
1.	"Lumos! (Hedwig's Theme)"	1:38
2.	"Aunt Marge's Waltz"	2:15
3.	"The Knight Bus"	2:52
4.	"Apparition on the Train"	2:15
5.	"Double Trouble"	1:37
6.	"Buckbeak's Flight"	2:08
7.	"A Window to the Past (Contains Hedwig Theme)"	3:54
8.	"The Whomping Willow and the Snowball Fight"	2:22
9.	"Secrets of the Castle (Contains Hedwig Theme)"	2:32
10.	"The Portrait Gallery"	2:05
11.	"Hagrid the Professor"	1:59
12.	"Monster Books and Boggarts!"	2:26
13.	"Quidditch, Third Year"	3:47
14.	"Lupin's Transformation and Chasing Scabbers"	3:01
15.	"The Patronus Light"	1:12
16.	"The Werewolf Scene"	4:25
17.	"Saving Buckbeak"	6:39
18.	"Forward to Time Past"	2:33
19.	"The Dementors Converge"	3:12
20.	"Finale"	3:24
21.	"Mischief Managed! (Contains Hedwig Theme)"	12:10
Total length:		68:37

=== Harry Potter - The John Williams Soundtrack Collection: Disc 6 ===
The Film Score
No.	Title	Length
1.	"Lumos! (Hedwig's Theme)"	1:43
2.	"Aunt Marge's Waltz"	2:18
3.	"Parents' Portrait and The Empty Playground"	1:02
4.	"The Knight Bus [Extended Version]"	3:56
5.	"Monster Book and Discussing Black"	2:00
6.	"Apparition on the Train [Film Version]"	2:18
7.	"Double Trouble"	1:38
8.	"Trouble Takes Many Forms"	1:52
9.	"Rainy Nights, Dementors and Birds"	1:03
10.	"The Courtyard and Sir Cadogan"	1:23
11.	"The Hippogriff Lesson"	1:31
12.	"Befriending the Hippogriff"	1:45
13.	"Buckbeak's Flight"	2:10
14.	"The Grim / The Newspaper"	1:11
15.	"The Boggarts"	3:01
16.	"On the Bridge - Remembering Mother"	1:47
17.	"The Portrait Gallery"	2:08
18.	"The Big Doors and The Great Hall Ceiling"	2:15
19.	"Page 394 and Quidditch, Third Year"	4:02
20.	"A Walk in the Woods and Bird's Flight"	2:53
21.	"The Snowball Fight"	1:05
22.	"The Three Broomsticks"	3:51
23.	"Summoning the Patronus"	3:26
24.	"Buckbeak's Fate and The Marauder's Map"	3:15
25.	"About Pettigrew / The Crystal Ball"	3:22
26.	"The Executioner"	0:46
27.	"The Walk to Buckbeak"	0:46
28.	"The Sentence"	2:44
29.	"Chasing Scabbers"	1:08
30.	"The Whomping Willow"	1:30
31.	"Confrontation in the Shrieking Shack"	6:31
32.	"Sirius and Harry"	1:54
33.	"The Werewolf Scene"	4:29

=== Harry Potter - The John Williams Soundtrack Collection: Disc 7 ===
The Film Score [continued]
No.	Title	Length
1.	"The Dementors Converge [Film Version]"	3:10
2.	"Time Past / Saving Buckbeak"	9:57
3.	"Lupin's Transformation"	2:05
4.	"Buckbeak Saves the Day / Watching the Past"	2:43
5.	"The Rescue of Sirius"	1:22
6.	"Sirius Says Goodbye / Turning Time Back"	2:16
7.	"Lupin's Departure"	1:22
8.	"The Firebolt and End Credits Suite"	7:22

Source Music
No.	Title	Length
9.	"The Wizards' Consort (Source Music)"	2:48
10.	"Hogsmeade Candy Box (Source Music)"	1:21
11.	"A Winter's Spell (Source Music)"	1:14

Additional Music
No.	Title	Length
12.	"Lumos! (Hedwig's Theme)"	1:40
13.	"Aunt Marge's Waltz [Alternate]"	2:34
14.	"The Knight Bus [Alternate]"	3:58
15.	"Apparition on the Train"	2:20
16.	"More Grim and Boggarts"	1:37
17.	"Quidditch, Third Year"	3:54
18.	"Window to the Past"	3:58
19.	"Saving Buckbeak [Alternate Segment]"	4:24
20.	"Lupin's Transformation [Alternate]"	2:05
21.	"Watching the Past [Alternate]"	2:21
22.	"The Dementors Circle"	0:46
23.	"The Patronus Light"	1:16
24.	"The Patronus Power"	0:47
25.	"The Dementors Converge"	3:15
26.	"The Firebolt [Alternate]"	1:30
27.	"Teaser"	1:27
28.	"Trailer"	1:52

== Track details ==
=== Lumos! (Hedwig's Theme) ===
This is the final movie in the Harry Potter series to use Hedwig's Theme in its original, gradually building form during the opening (until the credits of Deathly Hallows Part 2). This version includes a slightly more ominous celesta melody, and retains the woodwind melody, but features a short harp motif at the end.

=== "Double Trouble" ===
"Double Trouble" was composed by John Williams during the film's production since he felt it to be a warm welcome back to Hogwarts. The song was sung by the London Oratory School Schola, and its lyrics are taken directly from William Shakespeare's Macbeth, in which they are spoken by three witches.

=== "Forward to Time Past" ===
"Forward to Time Past" is heard when Hermione and Harry use the Time-Turner to go back in time. During the whole piece a ticking sound is heard, indicating that time is running out. Loads of flourishing strings overlap the four-note motif that the brass repeats rhythmically, and lastly, the little bursts of woodwind throughout enforce the sensation of movement.

=== "The Dementors Converge" ===
"The Dementors Converge" is heard when Harry is attempting to save Sirius Black from the Dementors. The piece mainly consists of discordant wavering strings at the beginning, but as it progresses, Williams weaves punctuating piccolos and long notes of brass that gradually build up the menacing tension. This rises to a climax where thunderous clusters of timpani and hair-raising choir are introduced only to die back down, followed by an atmospheric flutter from the harp. The strings then lead into another extremity that uses bits and pieces from Williams' "The Patronus Light", interjected by harsh grating brass. The music appears to die off again instantly; however, the familiar sound of lush strings and celesta (so prominent in Williams' earlier scores for these films) subdue the tension afore.

=== "Mischief Managed!" ===
“Mischief Managed!” is the final track on the Harry Potter and the Prisoner of Azkaban (Original Motion Picture Soundtrack), composed and conducted by John Williams. Running over twelve minutes, it is the longest piece on the album and functions as a closing suite that reprises and weaves together many of the film’s central themes, including Hedwig’s Theme, Buckbeak’s Flight, A Window to the Past, and Double Trouble. The track serves as a musical coda to the soundtrack, summarizing key motifs heard earlier in the score and providing a sense of resolution at the end of the recording.

== Responses and ratings ==
The album was well received among film music critics. Archie Watt of MovieCues highly praised the score, calling it "One of the best albums of 2004, and well worth a listen by any film music or John Williams fan."

== Charts ==
Weekly chart performance for Harry Potter and the Prisoner of Azkaban
Chart (2025)	Peak position
Hungarian Physical Albums (MAHASZ)	21
