= Harry Potter and the Order of the Phoenix (soundtrack) =

Harry Potter and the Order of the Phoenix (Original Motion Picture Soundtrack)

Film score by Nicholas Hooper
- Released: 10 July 2007
- Recorded: 2007
- Studio: Abbey Road Studios
- Genre: Soundtrack
- Length: 52:22
- Label: Warner/Sunset

Professional ratings
Review scores
Source	Rating
AllMusic	3.5/5 stars
Filmtracks	3/5 stars
Movie Music UK	3.5/5 stars
Movie Wave	2.5/5 stars
Tracksounds	4/5 stars

Harry Potter and the Order of the Phoenix (Original Motion Picture Soundtrack) is the soundtrack to the 2007 film of the same name, based on the book by J. K. Rowling. Nicholas Hooper composed the film's score, following John Williams, who scored the first three films, and Patrick Doyle, who did the fourth. Though new to the series, Hooper had worked with director David Yates before. The soundtrack was released 10 July 2007, the day before the film's release.

== Development ==
Hooper incorporated "Hedwig's Theme", the series' theme originally written by John Williams for the first film and heard in all subsequent entries, into the score. In March and April 2007, Hooper, conductor Alastair King and a 90-piece of the Chamber Orchestra of London recorded nearly two hours of music at Abbey Road Studios in London with orchestrations provided by King, Geoff Alexander, Julian Kershaw, Bradley Miles and Simon Whiteside. Two new main themes were made to reflect the new character Dolores Umbridge and Lord Voldemort's invasion of Harry's mind. A Japanese Taiko drum was used for a deeper sound in the percussion. The trailer contains a track by X-Ray Dog, entitled "Divine Crusade", which first appeared on the album K-9 Empire before being licensed to Order of the Phoenix.

Hooper said he reviewed the previous soundtracks of the Harry Potter films by John Williams, particularly the third soundtrack, but ultimately "decided that it was best if I moved into my own way of composing rather than trying to emulate John Williams, which is impossible."

== Release ==
The soundtrack was also released in a special edition, with a custom hinged box with Navy velveteen fabric. Inside the box is a 20-page booklet with a foil-embossed front cover.

== Reception ==
Critical reaction to the score was fairly mixed compared to the previous four scores in the series. Christian Clemmensen of Filmtracks awarding the score three stars out of five, saying "...it fails to provide continuity within either its own confines or those of the franchise as a whole". Archie Watt of MovieCues said "This isn't a bad score by any means, but there can be little argument that it is the weakest of all the Harry Potter scores to date".

== Chart performance ==
The soundtrack debuted at number 43 on the U.S. Billboard 200, selling about 16,000 copies in its first week and has since sold a total of 356,000 copies in U.S. and a million copies worldwide. The soundtrack also charted at five on the Top Soundtracks Chart.

== Track listing ==
Harry Potter and the Order of the Phoenix (Original Motion Picture Soundtrack) track listing
No.	Title	Music	Length
1.	"Fireworks"		1:49
2.	"Professor Umbridge"		2:35
3.	"Another Story"	Includes Hedwig's Theme by John Williams	2:41
4.	"Dementors in the Underpass"		1:45
5.	"Dumbledore's Army"		2:42
6.	"The Hall of Prophecies"	Includes Hedwig's Theme	4:27
7.	"Possession"		3:20
8.	"The Room of Requirements"	Includes Hedwig's Theme	6:09
9.	"The Kiss"		1:56
10.	"A Journey to Hogwarts"	Includes Hedwig's Theme	2:54
11.	"The Sirius Deception"		2:36
12.	"Death of Sirius"		3:58
13.	"Umbridge Spoils a Beautiful Morning"		2:39
14.	"Darkness Takes Over"		2:58
15.	"The Ministry of Magic"		2:48
16.	"The Sacking of Trelawney"		2:15
17.	"Flight of the Order of the Phoenix"		1:34
18.	"Loved Ones and Leaving"		3:15
Total length:			51:56

- "Dumbledore's Army" was used in the Quidditch trials scene in Harry Potter and the Half-Blood Prince.
- "Another Story", "Hall of Prophecy", "The Room of Requirement", and "A Journey to Hogwarts" contain samples of "Hedwig's Theme" written by John Williams.
- "The Kiss" was heard in the viaduct scene during the end of Harry Potter and the Deathly Hallows Part 2.

== Charts ==
Weekly chart performance for Harry Potter And The Order Of The Phoenix
Chart (2025)	Peak position
Hungarian Physical Albums (MAHASZ)	27
