= Conrad Pope =

American orchestrator and film composer

- Occupations: Orchestrator; composer
- Years active: 1990–present

Conrad Pope is an American orchestrator and film composer. He has worked on numerous films and has collaborated with composers such as John Williams, James Newton Howard, Alan Silvestri, Danny Elfman, Mark Isham, James Horner, John Powell, Alexandre Desplat, and Howard Shore.

In 2025, he received an honorary doctorate in music from the New England Conservatory of Music.

== Filmography ==
- Patriot Games (1992) original music
- Jurassic Park (1993) orchestration
- Once Upon a Forest (1993) orchestration
- The Santa Clause (1994) orchestration, song arrangement (The Bells of Christmas)
- The Set Up (1995) composer
- Project Metalbeast (1995) composer
- The Long Kiss Goodnight (1996) original music
- My Fellow Americans (1996) original music
- Eraser (1996) original music
- The Lost World: Jurassic Park (1997) orchestration
- A Smile Like Yours (1997) original music
- Volcano (1997) original music
- Mouse Hunt (1997) original music
- Jungle 2 Jungle (1997) original music
- Home Alone 3 (1997) original music
- Butch Camp (1997) music
- Amistad (1997) orchestration
- The Matrix (1999) original music
- Stuart Little (1999) orchestration
- Star Wars: Episode I - The Phantom Menace (1999) orchestration
- Sleepy Hollow (1999) orchestration
- What Women Want (2000) music orchestrator
- Lloyd (2000) music
- Battlefield Earth (2000) orchestra conductor
- The Mexican (2001) original music
- The Amati Girls (2001) music
- Pavilion of Women (2001) music, orchestration
- Harry Potter and the Sorcerer's Stone (2001) orchestrations
- The Rising Place (2002) composer
- Star Wars: Episode II - Attack of the Clones (2002) orchestration
- Star Trek: Nemesis (2002) orchestration
- Harry Potter and the Chamber of Secrets (2002) original music
- The Matrix Reloaded (2003) original music
- The Matrix Revolutions (2003) orchestrations
- Peter Pan (2003) orchestrations
- Hollywood Homicide (2003) orchestrations
- The Polar Express (2004) orchestrations
- Troy (2004) orchestrations and additional music
- Harry Potter and the Prisoner of Azkaban (2004) orchestration
- The Legend of Zorro (2005) orchestrations
- War of the Worlds (2005) orchestrations
- Star Wars: Episode III – Revenge of the Sith (2005) orchestrations
- Munich (2005) orchestrations
- Memoirs of a Geisha (2005) orchestrations
- King Kong (2005) orchestrations
- Flightplan (2005) orchestrations
- X-Men: The Last Stand (2006) orchestrations
- Night at the Museum (2006) score orchestrator
- Invincible (2006) orchestrations
- Firewall (2006) orchestrations
- Bobby (2006) orchestrations
- The Golden Compass (2007) supervising orchestrator, orchestrations
- No Reservations (2007) music conductor (Truffles and Quail), music producer (Truffles and Quail)
- Next (2007) orchestrations
- Lions for Lambs (2007) orchestrations
- In the Valley of Elah (2007) orchestrator
- Gracie (2007) supervising orchestrator
- Freedom Writers (2007) orchestrations
- The Tale of Despereaux (2008) orchestrations
- The Secret Life of Bees (2008) supervising orchestrations
- The Express: The Ernie Davis Story (2008) orchestrations
- The Curious Case of Benjamin Button (2008) orchestrations
- Pride and Glory (2008) orchestrations
- Indiana Jones and the Kingdom of the Crystal Skull (2008) orchestrations
- Horton Hears a Who! (2008) orchestrations
- Julie and Julia (2009) orchestrator
- Ice Age: Dawn of the Dinosaurs (2009) orchestrator
- A Christmas Carol (2009) orchestrator
- Crossing Over (2009) supervising orchestrator
- Bad Lieutenant: Port of Call New Orleans (2009) supervising orchestrator
- The Wolfman (2010) additional music
- Salt (2010) orchestrator
- In My Sleep (2010) original music
- Harry Potter and the Deathly Hallows – Part 1 (2010) supervising orchestrator
- Harry Potter and the Deathly Hallows – Part 2 (2011) supervising orchestrator
- My Week with Marilyn (2011) composer (with Alexandre Desplat); supervising orchestrator and producer
- The Hobbit: The Desolation of Smaug (2013) orchestrator and conductor
- Tim's Vermeer (2013) orchestrator and conductor
