= For New York =

For New York (Variations on Themes of Leonard Bernstein) (originally titled To Lenny! To Lenny!) is a one-movement orchestral composition by the American composer John Williams. Written as a tribute to fellow composer and conductor Leonard Bernstein, the piece premiered on the last day of Bernstein's 70th birthday gala at Tanglewood on August 28, 1988. The premiere was performed by the Boston Symphony Orchestra under Williams, who was then conductor of its sister orchestra, the Boston Pops. Music critic John Rockwell of The New York Times described the work as "feathery and flashy."

== Composition ==
For New York utilizes themes from Bernstein's musicals On the Town and West Side Story ("New York, New York" and "America", respectively), though the climax also contains subtle references to "Happy Birthday to You". A performance of the piece lasts approximately three minutes.

== Discography ==
A recording of For New York was released January 15, 2002 on a compilation album by Sony Classical Records. The album also featured Williams' 1996 and 2002 Olympic themes, the NBC Nightly News theme The Mission, the six part American Journey, and various other celebratory works and fanfares for orchestra.
