= List of awards and nominations received by John Williams =

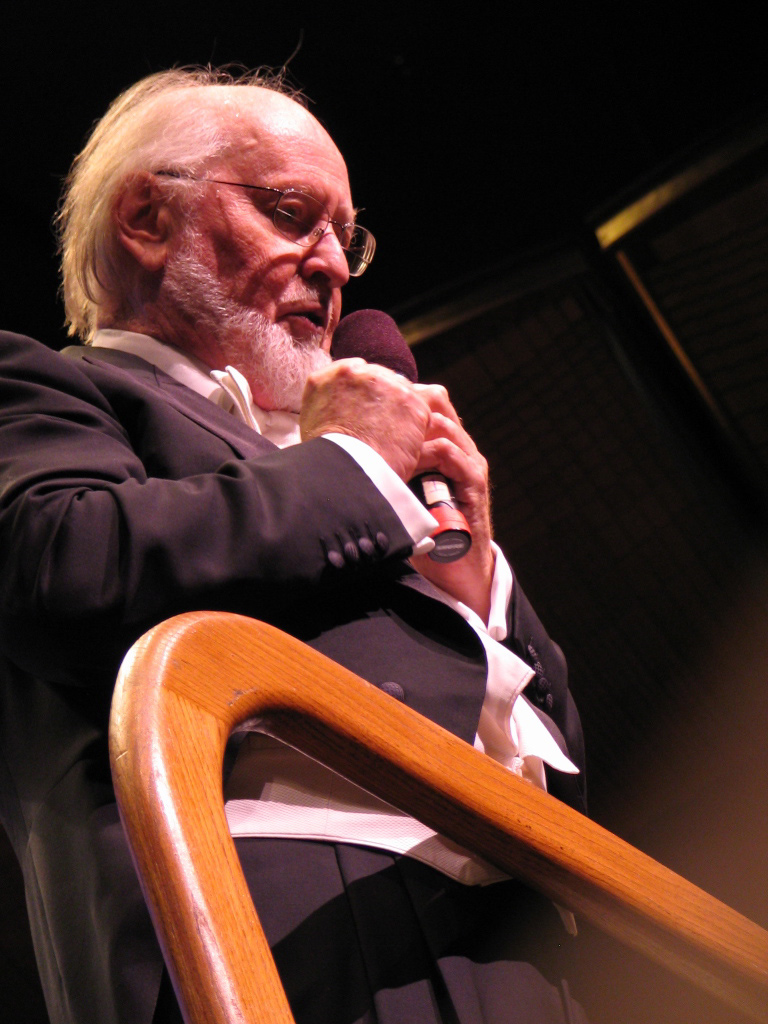
John Williams in 2007

This is a list of awards and nominations received by the American composer John Williams.

John Williams has been nominated for 54 Academy Awards, winning 5; 6 Emmy Awards, winning 3; 26 Golden Globe Awards, winning 4; 76 Grammy Awards, winning 27; 16 British Academy Film Awards, winning 7; 23 Saturn Awards, winning 10. In 2022, Williams was appointed an Honorary Knight Commander of the Order of the British Empire (KBE) by Queen Elizabeth II, "for services to film music".

With 54 Oscar nominations, Williams currently holds the record for the most Oscar nominations for a living person, and is the second most nominated person in Academy Awards history behind Walt Disney with 59, as well as the only person in the history of the Academy Awards to have received nominations in seven consecutive decades. Forty-eight of Williams's Oscar nominations are for Best Original Score and five are for Best Original Song. He won four Oscars for Best Original Score and one for Best Scoring: Adaptation and Original Song Score (Fiddler on the Roof).

Williams has won the Grammy Awards for Best Instrumental Composition and Best Score Soundtrack for Visual Media several times for his scores for Star Wars, Close Encounters of the Third Kind, Superman, The Empire Strikes Back, E.T. the Extraterrestrial, Munich, Indiana Jones and the Kingdom of the Crystal Skull, The Book Thief, The Force Awakens and Indiana Jones and the Dial of Destiny. The competition includes composers of instrumental music of any genre.

== Major associations ==
=== Academy Awards ===
| Year | Category | Nominated work | Result | Ref. |
|---|---|---|---|---|
| 1968 | Best Scoring of Music – Adaptation or Treatment | Valley of the Dolls | Nominated | |
| 1970 | Best Score of a Musical Picture – Original or Adaptation | Goodbye, Mr. Chips | Nominated | |
| 1970 | Best Original Score for a Motion Picture (Not a Musical) | The Reivers | Nominated | |
| 1972 | Best Scoring: Adaptation and Original Song Score | Fiddler on the Roof | Won | |
| 1973 | Best Original Dramatic Score | Images | Nominated | |
| 1973 | Best Original Dramatic Score | The Poseidon Adventure | Nominated | |
| 1974 | Best Original Dramatic Score | Cinderella Liberty | Nominated | |
| 1974 | Best Song | "Nice to Be Around" (from Cinderella Liberty) | Nominated | |
| 1974 | Best Scoring: Original Song Score and Adaptation or Scoring: Adaptation | Tom Sawyer | Nominated | |
| 1975 | Best Original Dramatic Score | The Towering Inferno | Nominated | |
| 1976 | Best Original Score | Jaws | Won | |
| 1978 | Best Original Score | Star Wars | Won | |
| 1978 | Best Original Score | Close Encounters of the Third Kind | Nominated | |
| 1979 | Best Original Score | Superman | Nominated | |
| 1981 | Best Original Score | The Empire Strikes Back | Nominated | |
| 1982 | Best Original Score | Raiders of the Lost Ark | Nominated | |
| 1983 | Best Original Score | E.T. the Extra-Terrestrial | Won | |
| 1983 | Best Original Song | "If We Were in Love" (from Yes, Giorgio) | Nominated | |
| 1984 | Best Original Score | Return of the Jedi | Nominated | |
| 1985 | Best Original Score | Indiana Jones and the Temple of Doom | Nominated | |
| 1985 | Best Original Score | The River | Nominated | |
| 1988 | Best Original Score | Empire of the Sun | Nominated | |
| 1988 | Best Original Score | The Witches of Eastwick | Nominated | |
| 1989 | Best Original Score | The Accidental Tourist | Nominated | |
| 1990 | Best Original Score | Born on the Fourth of July | Nominated | |
| 1990 | Best Original Score | Indiana Jones and the Last Crusade | Nominated | |
| 1991 | Best Original Score | Home Alone | Nominated | |
| 1991 | Best Original Song | "Somewhere in My Memory" (from Home Alone) | Nominated | |
| 1992 | Best Original Score | JFK | Nominated | |
| 1992 | Best Original Song | "When You're Alone" (from Hook) | Nominated | |
| 1994 | Best Original Score | Schindler's List | Won | |
| 1996 | Best Original Song | "Moonlight" (from Sabrina) | Nominated | |
| 1996 | Best Original Musical or Comedy Score | Sabrina | Nominated | |
| 1996 | Best Original Dramatic Score | Nixon | Nominated | |
| 1997 | Best Original Dramatic Score | Sleepers | Nominated | |
| 1998 | Best Original Dramatic Score | Amistad | Nominated | |
| 1999 | Best Original Dramatic Score | Saving Private Ryan | Nominated | |
| 2000 | Best Original Score | Angela's Ashes | Nominated | |
| 2001 | Best Original Score | The Patriot | Nominated | |
| 2002 | Best Original Score | A.I. Artificial Intelligence | Nominated | |
| 2002 | Best Original Score | Harry Potter and the Sorcerer's Stone | Nominated | |
| 2003 | Best Original Score | Catch Me If You Can | Nominated | |
| 2005 | Best Original Score | Harry Potter and the Prisoner of Azkaban | Nominated | |
| 2006 | Best Original Score | Memoirs of a Geisha | Nominated | |
| 2006 | Best Original Score | Munich | Nominated | |
| 2012 | Best Original Score | The Adventures of Tintin | Nominated | |
| 2012 | Best Original Score | War Horse | Nominated | |
| 2013 | Best Original Score | Lincoln | Nominated | |
| 2014 | Best Original Score | The Book Thief | Nominated | |
| 2016 | Best Original Score | Star Wars: The Force Awakens | Nominated | |
| 2018 | Best Original Score | Star Wars: The Last Jedi | Nominated | |
| 2020 | Best Original Score | Star Wars: The Rise of Skywalker | Nominated | |
| 2023 | Best Original Score | The Fabelmans | Nominated | |
| 2024 | Best Original Score | Indiana Jones and the Dial of Destiny | Nominated | |

=== BAFTA Awards ===
| Year | Category | Nominated work | Result | Ref. |
British Academy Film Awards
| 1976 | Anthony Asquith Award for Original Film Music | Jaws and The Towering Inferno | Won | |
| 1979 | Anthony Asquith Award for Original Film Music | Star Wars | Won | |
| 1979 | Anthony Asquith Award for Original Film Music | Close Encounters of the Third Kind | Nominated | |
| 1981 | Best Original Film Music | The Empire Strikes Back | Won | |
| 1982 | Best Original Film Music | Raiders of the Lost Ark | Nominated | |
| 1983 | Best Score for a Film | E.T. the Extra-Terrestrial | Won | |
| 1989 | Best Score for a Film | Empire of the Sun | Won | |
| 1994 | Best Score for a Film | Schindler's List | Won | |
| 1999 | Anthony Asquith Award for Original Film Music | Saving Private Ryan | Nominated | |
| 2003 | Anthony Asquith Award for Original Film Music | Catch Me If You Can | Nominated | |
| 2006 | Anthony Asquith Award for Original Film Music | Memoirs of a Geisha | Won | |
| 2012 | Best Original Music | War Horse | Nominated | |
| 2013 | Best Original Music | Lincoln | Nominated | |
| 2014 | Best Original Music | The Book Thief | Nominated | |
| 2016 | Best Original Music | Star Wars: The Force Awakens | Nominated | |
| 2020 | Best Original Score | Star Wars: The Rise of Skywalker | Nominated | |

=== Emmy Awards ===
| Year | Category | Nominated work | Result | Ref. |
Primetime Emmy Awards
| 1962 | Outstanding Music Composition for a Series | Alcoa Premiere | Nominated | |
| 1963 | Outstanding Achievement in Composing Original Music | Alcoa Premiere | Nominated | |
| 1969 | Outstanding Achievement in Musical Composition | Heidi | Won | |
| 1972 | Outstanding Music Composition for a Series | Jane Eyre | Won | |
| 2002 | Outstanding Music Direction | The 74th Annual Academy Awards | Nominated | |
| 2009 | Outstanding Original Main Title Theme Music | Great Performances | Won | |

=== Golden Globe Awards ===
| Year | Category | Nominated work | Result | Ref. |
|---|---|---|---|---|
| 1973 | Best Original Score – Motion Picture | The Poseidon Adventure | Nominated | |
| 1974 | Best Original Score – Motion Picture | Cinderella Liberty | Nominated | |
| 1975 | Best Original Score – Motion Picture | Earthquake | Nominated | |
| 1976 | Best Original Score – Motion Picture | Jaws | Won | |
| 1978 | Best Original Score – Motion Picture | Close Encounters of the Third Kind | Nominated | |
| 1978 | Best Original Score – Motion Picture | Star Wars: Episode IV – A New Hope | Won | |
| 1979 | Best Original Score – Motion Picture | Superman | Nominated | |
| 1981 | Best Original Score – Motion Picture | Star Wars: Episode V – The Empire Strikes Back | Nominated | |
| 1983 | Best Original Score – Motion Picture | E.T. the Extra-Terrestrial | Won | |
| 1983 | Best Original Song – Motion Picture | "If We Were in Love" (from Yes, Giorgio) | Nominated | |
| 1985 | Best Original Score – Motion Picture | The River | Nominated | |
| 1988 | Best Original Score – Motion Picture | Empire of the Sun | Nominated | |
| 1989 | Best Original Score – Motion Picture | The Accidental Tourist | Nominated | |
| 1990 | Best Original Score – Motion Picture | Born on the Fourth of July | Nominated | |
| 1994 | Best Original Score – Motion Picture | Schindler's List | Nominated | |
| 1996 | Best Original Song – Motion Picture | "Moonlight" (from Sabrina) | Nominated | |
| 1998 | Best Original Score – Motion Picture | Seven Years in Tibet | Nominated | |
| 1999 | Best Original Score – Motion Picture | Saving Private Ryan | Nominated | |
| 2000 | Best Original Score – Motion Picture | Angela's Ashes | Nominated | |
| 2002 | Best Original Score – Motion Picture | A.I. Artificial Intelligence | Nominated | |
| 2006 | Best Original Score – Motion Picture | Memoirs of a Geisha | Won | |
| 2012 | Best Original Score – Motion Picture | War Horse | Nominated | |
| 2013 | Best Original Score – Motion Picture | Lincoln | Nominated | |
| 2014 | Best Original Score – Motion Picture | The Book Thief | Nominated | |
| 2018 | Best Original Score – Motion Picture | The Post | Nominated | |
| 2023 | Best Original Score – Motion Picture | The Fabelmans | Nominated | |

=== Grammy Awards ===
| Year | Category | Nominated work | Result | Ref. |
|---|---|---|---|---|
| 1962 | Best Score Soundtrack for Visual Media | Checkmate | Nominated | |
| 1976 | Best Score Soundtrack for Visual Media | Jaws | Won | |
| 1977 | Best Instrumental Arrangement | "The Disaster Movie Suite" | Nominated | |
| 1978 | Best Instrumental Composition | "Star Wars (Main Title)" | Won | |
| 1978 | Best Pop Instrumental Recording | Star Wars | Won | |
| 1978 | Best Score Soundtrack for Visual Media | Star Wars | Won | |
| 1978 | Album of the Year | Star Wars | Nominated | |
| 1979 | Best Instrumental Composition | "Theme from Close Encounters of the Third Kind" | Won | |
| 1979 | Best Score Soundtrack for Visual Media | Close Encounters of the Third Kind | Won | |
| 1979 | Best Pop Instrumental Performance | Close Encounters of the Third Kind | Nominated | |
| 1980 | Best Instrumental Composition | "Superman March" | Won | |
| 1980 | Best Pop Instrumental Performance | "Superman March" | Nominated | |
| 1980 | Best Score Soundtrack for Visual Media | Superman | Won | |
| 1981 | Best Pop Instrumental Performance | "Yoda's Theme" | Nominated | |
| 1981 | Best Instrumental Composition | "Yoda's Theme" | Nominated | |
| 1981 | Best Instrumental Composition | "The Imperial March" | Nominated | |
| 1981 | Best Instrumental Composition | The Empire Strikes Back | Won | |
| 1981 | Best Score Soundtrack for Visual Media | The Empire Strikes Back | Won | |
| 1982 | Best Score Soundtrack for Visual Media | Raiders of the Lost Ark | Won | |
| 1983 | Best Score Soundtrack for Visual Media | E.T. the Extra-Terrestrial | Won | |
| 1983 | Best Pop Instrumental Performance | E.T. the Extra-Terrestrial | Nominated | |
| 1983 | Best Instrumental Composition | "Adventures on Earth" | Nominated | |
| 1983 | Best Instrumental Composition | "Flying Theme from E.T. the Extra-Terrestrial" | Won | |
| 1983 | Best Arrangement on an Instrumental Recording | "Flying Theme from E.T. the Extra-Terrestrial" | Won | |
| 1984 | Best Score Soundtrack for Visual Media | Return of the Jedi | Nominated | |
| 1985 | Best Instrumental Composition | "Olympic Fanfare and Theme" | Won | |
| 1986 | Best Recording for Children | Prokofiev: Peter and the Wolf | Nominated | |
| 1988 | Best Score Soundtrack for Visual Media | The Witches of Eastwick | Nominated | |
| 1989 | Best Score Soundtrack for Visual Media | Empire of the Sun | Nominated | |
| 1989 | Best Instrumental Composition | "The Olympic Spirit" | Nominated | |
| 1990 | Best Score Soundtrack for Visual Media | Indiana Jones and the Last Crusade | Nominated | |
| 1991 | Best Arrangement on an Instrumental Recording | Born on the Fourth of July | Nominated | |
| 1992 | Best Pop Instrumental Performance | John Williams Conducts John Williams: The Star Wars Trilogy | Nominated | |
| 1992 | Best Song Written for Visual Media | "Somewhere in My Memory" (from Home Alone) | Nominated | |
| 1993 | Best Pop Instrumental Performance | Hook | Nominated | |
| 1993 | Best Score Soundtrack for Visual Media | Hook | Nominated | |
| 1994 | Best Score Soundtrack for Visual Media | Jurassic Park | Nominated | |
| 1995 | Best Score Soundtrack for Visual Media | Schindler's List | Won | |
| 1997 | Best Song Written for Visual Media | "Moonlight" (from Sabrina) | Nominated | |
| 1998 | Best Score Soundtrack for Visual Media | The Lost World: Jurassic Park | Nominated | |
| 1998 | Best Score Soundtrack for Visual Media | Seven Years in Tibet | Nominated | |
| 1999 | Best Score Soundtrack for Visual Media | Saving Private Ryan | Won | |
| 1999 | Best Score Soundtrack for Visual Media | Amistad | Nominated | |
| 1999 | Best Classical Crossover Album | Gershwin Fantasy | Nominated | |
| 2000 | Best Score Soundtrack for Visual Media | Star Wars Episode I: The Phantom Menace | Nominated | |
| 2000 | Best Instrumental Arrangement | "Stella by Starlight (from The Uninvited)" | Nominated | |
| 2001 | Best Instrumental Composition | "Theme from Angela's Ashes" | Won | |
| 2002 | Best Score Soundtrack for Visual Media | A.I. Artificial Intelligence | Nominated | |
| 2003 | Best Instrumental Composition | "Hedwig's Theme" | Nominated | |
| 2003 | Best Score Soundtrack for Visual Media | Harry Potter and the Sorcerer's Stone | Nominated | |
| 2004 | Best Score Soundtrack for Visual Media | Catch Me If You Can | Nominated | |
| 2004 | Best Score Soundtrack for Visual Media | Harry Potter and the Chamber of Secrets | Nominated | |
| 2005 | Best Score Soundtrack for Visual Media | Harry Potter and the Prisoner of Azkaban | Nominated | |
| 2006 | Best Score Soundtrack for Visual Media | Star Wars Episode III: Revenge of the Sith | Nominated | |
| 2006 | Best Instrumental Composition | "Anakin's Betrayal" | Nominated | |
| 2006 | Best Instrumental Composition | "The Ferry Scene" | Nominated | |
| 2007 | Best Score Soundtrack for Visual Media | Memoirs of a Geisha | Won | |
| 2007 | Best Score Soundtrack for Visual Media | Munich | Nominated | |
| 2007 | Best Instrumental Composition | "A Prayer for Peace" | Won | |
| 2007 | Best Instrumental Composition | "Sayuri's Theme and End Credits" | Nominated | |
| 2009 | Best Score Soundtrack for Visual Media | Indiana Jones and the Kingdom of the Crystal Skull | Nominated | |
| 2009 | Best Instrumental Composition | "The Adventures of Mutt" | Won | |
| 2013 | Best Score Soundtrack for Visual Media | The Adventures of Tintin: The Secret of the Unicorn | Nominated | |
| 2014 | Best Score Soundtrack for Visual Media | Lincoln | Nominated | |
| 2015 | Best Instrumental Composition | "The Book Thief" | Won | |
| 2017 | Best Score Soundtrack for Visual Media | Star Wars: The Force Awakens | Won | |
| 2018 | Best Arrangement, Instrumental or A Cappella | "Escapades for Alto Saxophone and Orchestra from Catch Me If You Can" | Won | |
| 2019 | Best Score Soundtrack for Visual Media | Star Wars: The Last Jedi | Nominated | |
| 2019 | Best Instrumental Composition | "Mine Mission" | Nominated | |
| 2020 | Best Instrumental Composition | "Star Wars: Galaxy's Edge Symphonic Suite" | Won | |
| 2020 | Best Arrangement, Instrumental or A Cappella | "Hedwig's Theme" | Nominated | |
| 2021 | Best Score Soundtrack for Visual Media | Star Wars: The Rise of Skywalker | Nominated | |
| 2023 | Best Orchestral Performance | "The Berlin Concert" (John Williams, conductor, Berliner Philharmoniker) | Nominated | |
| 2024 | Best Score Soundtrack for Visual Media | The Fabelmans | Nominated | |
| 2024 | Best Score Soundtrack for Visual Media | Indiana Jones and the Dial of Destiny | Nominated | |
| 2024 | Best Instrumental Composition | "Helena's Theme", Indiana Jones and the Dial of Destiny | Won | |
| 2026 | Best Music Film | Music by John Williams | Won | |

== Miscellaneous ==
=== Saturn Awards ===
| Year | Category | Nominated work | Result |
|---|---|---|---|
| 1978 | Best Music | Star Wars | Won |
| 1978 | Best Music | Close Encounters of the Third Kind | Won |
| 1979 | Best Music | Superman | Won |
| 1981 | Best Music | The Empire Strikes Back | Nominated |
| 1982 | Best Music | Raiders of the Lost Ark | Won |
| 1983 | Best Music | E.T. the Extra-Terrestrial | Won |
| 1984 | Best Music | Return of the Jedi | Nominated |
| 1988 | Best Music | The Witches of Eastwick | Nominated |
| 1994 | Best Music | Jurassic Park | Nominated |
| 2002 | Best Music | A.I. Artificial Intelligence | Won |
| 2003 | Best Music | Star Wars: Episode II – Attack of the Clones | Nominated |
| 2003 | Best Music | Minority Report | Nominated |
| 2005 | Best Music | Harry Potter and the Prisoner of Azkaban | Nominated |
| 2006 | Best Music | War of the Worlds | Nominated |
| 2006 | Best Music | Star Wars: Episode III – Revenge of the Sith | Won |
| 2012 | Best Music | War Horse | Nominated |
| 2012 | Best Music | The Adventures of Tintin | Nominated |
| 2014 | Best Music | The Book Thief | Nominated |
| 2016 | Best Music | Star Wars: The Force Awakens | Won |
| 2017 | Best Music | The BFG | Nominated |
| 2018 | Best Music | Star Wars: The Last Jedi | Nominated |
| 2021 | Best Music | Star Wars: The Rise of Skywalker | Won |
| 2024 | Best Music | Indiana Jones and the Dial of Destiny | Won |

== Honorary awards ==
| Year | Association | Award | Ref. |
|---|---|---|---|
| 1998 | Songwriters Hall of Fame | Inductee | |
| 1999 | BMI Film and TV Awards | Richard Kirk Award | |
| 2000 | Hollywood Bowl Hall of Fame | Inductee | |
| 2003 | International Olympic Committee | Olympic Order | |
| 2004 | American Classical Music Hall of Fame | Inductee | |
| 2004 | Kennedy Center Honor | Medal | |
| 2005 | Classic Brit Award | Award | |
| 2009 | National Medal of Arts | Award | |
| 2012 | Brit Award for Outstanding Contribution to Music | Composer of the Year | |
| 2013 | Ken Burns Lifetime Achievement Award | Career award | |
| 2016 | AFI Life Achievement Award | Honorary Award | |
| 2020 | Royal Philharmonic Society | The Gold Medal | |
| 2020 | Princess of Asturias Award for the Arts | Award | |
| 2022 | Honorary Knight Commander of the Order of the British Empire (KBE) | Honorary Knighthood | |
| 2024 | Disney Legends | Recipient | |

== Academic awards ==
| Year | University | Honor | Ref. |
|---|---|---|---|
| 1988 | Boston University | Kappa Kappa Psi | |
| 1993 | Boston College | Honorary Doctor of Music | |
| 2017 | Harvard University | Honorary Doctorate | |
| 2019 | Berklee College of Music | Honorary Doctorate of Music | |
| 2021 | University of Pennsylvania | Honorary Doctorate | |

== Special recognition ==
- In 2005 the American Film Institute selected Williams's score to 1977's Star Wars as the greatest American film score of all time. His scores for Jaws and E.T. also appeared on the list, at No. 6 and No. 14, respectively. He is the only composer to have three scores on the list. Williams received the AFI Life Achievement Award in June 2016, becoming the first composer to receive the award.
- Since 1988, Williams has been honored with 15 Sammy Film Music Awards, the longest-running awards for film music recordings.
- In 2018 the Broadcast Music, Inc. created The John Williams Award and awarded Williams with the inaugural award.
- In 2020, Vienna Philharmonic Orchestra honored Williams with a commission to compose a new procedural for their annual Philharmonikerball, to complement or replace their hitherto used 1924 fanfare composed by Richard Strauss.
- In 2022 British media company Global awarded Williams with one of their 2022 Global Awards, in the Best Classical Artist category.
- In 2023, Williams was made an honorary marine after conducting his fifth concert with the United States President's Own Marine Band at the John F. Kennedy Center for the Performing Arts in Washington D.C.
