= List of compositions by John Williams =

This is a list of compositions by John Williams.

== Film scores ==
The following list consists of select films for which John Williams composed the score and/or songs.

=== 1950s ===
Year	Title	Director	Studio	Notes
1954	You Are Welcome	Oliver L. Vardy	Studio Hamburg	Promotional film for the tourist information office of Newfoundland
1959	Daddy-O	Lou Place	American International Pictures	Feature film debut Credited as Johnny Williams.

=== 1960s ===
Year	Title	Director	Studio	Notes
1960	I Passed for White	Fred M. Wilcox	Allied Artists Pictures	Credited as Johnny Williams
1960	Because They're Young	Paul Wendkos	Jerry Bresler Productions; Columbia Pictures	Credited as Johnny Williams
1961	The Secret Ways	Phil Karlson; Richard Widmark	Heath Productions; Universal Pictures	Credited as Johnny Williams
1962	Bachelor Flat	Frank Tashlin; Budd Grossman	20th Century Fox	Credited as Johnny Williams
1963	Diamond Head	Guy Green	Jerry Bresler Productions; Columbia Pictures	Credited as Johnny Williams
1963	Gidget Goes to Rome	Paul Wendkos	Columbia Pictures	Credited as Johnny Williams
1964	Nightmare in Chicago	Robert Altman	Roncom Films; NBC	Television film
1964	The Killers	Don Siegel	Revue Studios; Universal Pictures	Credited as Johnny Williams; Adapted material by Henry Mancini
1964	Redcap	—N/a	ABC; ITV	Credited as Johnny Williams; Television series; Episode "Nightwatch"
1965	Lost in Space	Anton M. Leader; Sobey Martin; Paul Stanley	Irwin Allen Productions; Jodi Productions Inc. Van Bernard Productions Inc. 20th Century Fox Television; CBS	Credited as Johnny Williams; Television series; Episodes "The Reluctant Stowaway," "Island in the Sky", "The Hungry Sea" and "My Friend, Mr. Nobody". Williams composed two different opening themes, one used only for the first season; the second was also adapted by other composers for later film and TV remakes of the series.
1965	None but the Brave	Frank Sinatra	Tokyo Eiga; Toho; Artanis Productions; Warner Bros.	Credited as Johnny Williams
1965	John Goldfarb, Please Come Home!	J. Lee Thompson	Parker–Orchard Productions; 20th Century Fox	Credited as Johnny Williams
1966	The Rare Breed	Andrew V. McLaglen	Universal Pictures	Credited as Johnny Williams
1966	How to Steal a Million	William Wyler	World Wide Productions; 20th Century Fox	Credited as Johnny Williams
1966	The Plainsman	David Lowell Rich	Universal Pictures	Credited as Johnny Williams
1966	Not with My Wife, You Don't!	Norman Panama	Fernwood Productions; Reynard Productions; Warner Bros.	Credited as Johnny Williams
1966	Penelope	Arthur Hiller	Euterpe; Metro-Goldwyn-Mayer	Credited as Johnny Williams
1966	Jericho	Barry Shear	Arena Productions; MGM Television; CBS	Credited as Johnny Williams; Television series; Episode "The Ghostbreaker"
1966	Time Tunnel	Irwin Allen	Irwin Allen Productions; Kent Productions Inc. 20th Century Fox Television; ABC	Credited as Johnny Williams; Television series; Episode "Rendezvous With Yesterday"
1967	Valley of the Dolls	Mark Robson	20th Century Fox	Credited as Johnny Williams; Songs written by André and Dory Previn; Nominated—Academy Award for Best Scoring of Music — Adaptation or Treatment
1967	A Guide for the Married Man	Gene Kelly	20th Century Fox	Credited as Johnny Williams Composed title song (written by Leslie Bricusse, performed by The Turtles)
1967	Fitzwilly	Delbert Mann	The Mirisch Corporation; United Artists	Credited as Johnny Williams
1968	Sergeant Ryker	Buzz Kulik	Universal Pictures	Credited as Johnny Williams
1968	Land of the Giants	Irwin Allen	Irwin Allen Productions; Kent Productions Inc. 20th Century Fox Television; ABC	Credited as Johnny Williams; Television series; Episode "The Crash". Replaced a score by Alexander Courage
1968	Heidi	Delbert Mann	NBC	Television film
1969	Daddy's Gone A-Hunting	Mark Robson	National General Pictures	—N/a
1969	Goodbye, Mr. Chips	Herbert Ross	APJAC Productions; Metro-Goldwyn-Mayer (US); David Ortan (UK)	Nominated—Academy Award for Best Scoring of a Musical Picture — Original or Adaptation (shared with Leslie Bricusse)
1969	The Reivers	Mark Rydell	Cinema Center Films; Duo Films; Solar Productions; National General Pictures	Nominated—Academy Award for Best Original Score — For a Motion Picture (Not a Musical)

=== 1970s ===
Year	Title	Director	Studio	Notes
1970	Story of a Woman	Leonardo Bercovici	Westward Films; Universal Pictures	Only score for a non-English language film
1970	Jane Eyre	Delbert Mann	British Lion Film Corporation	Television film
1971	Fiddler on the Roof	Norman Jewison	The Mirisch Company; Cartier Productions; United Artists	Adapted from material by Jerry Bock; Academy Award for Best Scoring: Adaptation and Original Song Score
1972	The Cowboys	Mark Rydell	Warner Bros.	—N/a
1972	The Screaming Woman	Jack Smight	Universal Television; ABC	Television film
1972	The Poseidon Adventure	Ronald Neame	Kent Productions, Ltd. 20th Century Fox	Nominated—Academy Award for Best Original Dramatic Score; Nominated—Golden Globe Award for Best Original Score
1972	Pete 'n' Tillie	Martin Ritt	Universal Pictures	Credited as John T. Williams
1972	Images	Robert Altman	Hemdale Film Corporation; Columbia Pictures (US); Hemdale Film Distributors (UK)	Composed with Stomu Yamashta; Nominated—Academy Award for Best Original Dramatic Score
1973	The Long Goodbye	Robert Altman	Lion's Gate Films; United Artists	Also title song (with Johnny Mercer)
1973	Tom Sawyer	Don Taylor	Reader's Digest; United Artists	Nominated—Academy Award for Best Scoring: Original Song Score and Adaptation (shared with Robert B. Sherman and Richard M. Sherman); Nominated—Golden Globe Award for Best Original Score (shared with Robert B. Sherman and Richard M. Sherman)
1973	The Man Who Loved Cat Dancing	Richard C. Sarafian	Metro-Goldwyn-Mayer	Replaced a score by Michel Legrand.
1973	The Paper Chase	James Bridges	20th Century Fox	—N/a
1973	Cinderella Liberty	Mark Rydell	Sanford Productions; 20th Century Fox	Nominated—Academy Award for Best Original Dramatic Score; Nominated—Academy Award for Best Original Song ("Nice to Be Around," lyrics by Paul Williams); Nominated—Golden Globe Award for Best Original Score
1974	Conrack	Martin Ritt	20th Century Fox	—N/a
1974	The Sugarland Express	Steven Spielberg	The Zanuck/Brown Company; Universal Pictures	First collaboration with Steven Spielberg
1974	Earthquake	Mark Robson	The Filmakers Group; Universal Pictures	Nominated—Golden Globe Award for Best Original Score
1974	The Towering Inferno	John Guillermin	20th Century Fox; Warner Bros. Irwin Allen Productions	BAFTA Award for Best Film Music (shared with Jaws); Nominated—Academy Award for Best Original Dramatic Score
1975	The Eiger Sanction	Clint Eastwood	The Malpaso Company; Universal Pictures	—N/a
1975	Jaws	Steven Spielberg	The Zanuck/Brown Company; Universal Pictures	Academy Award for Best Original Score; BAFTA Award for Best Film Music (shared with The Towering Inferno); Golden Globe Award for Best Original Score; Grammy Award for Best Album of Original Score Written for a Motion Picture or Television Special
1976	Family Plot	Alfred Hitchcock	Universal Pictures	—N/a
1976	The Missouri Breaks	Arthur Penn	United Artists	—N/a
1976	Midway	Jack Smight	The Mirisch Corporation; Universal Pictures	—N/a
1977	Black Sunday	John Frankenheimer	Paramount Pictures	—N/a
1977	Star Wars	George Lucas	Lucasfilm Ltd. 20th Century Fox	Academy Award for Best Original Score; BAFTA Award for Best Film Music; Golden Globe Award for Best Original Score; Grammy Award for Best Instrumental Composition ("Main Title from Star Wars"); Grammy Award for Best Pop Instrumental Performance; Grammy Award for Best Album of Original Score Written for a Motion Picture or Television Special; Nominated—Grammy Award for Album of the Year
1977	Close Encounters of the Third Kind	Steven Spielberg	Columbia Pictures; EMI Films	Grammy Award for Best Instrumental Composition ("Theme from Close Encounters of the Third Kind"); Grammy Award for Best Album of Original Score Written for a Motion Picture or Television Special; Nominated—Academy Award for Best Original Score; Nominated—BAFTA Award for Best Film Music; Nominated—Golden Globe Award for Best Original Score; Nominated—Grammy Award for Best Pop Instrumental Performance
1978	The Fury	Brian De Palma	Frank Yablans Presentations; 20th Century Fox	—N/a
1978	Jaws 2	Jeannot Szwarc	The Zanuck/Brown Company; Universal Pictures	—N/a
1978	Superman	Richard Donner	Dovemead Ltd. Film Export, A.G. International Film Production; Warner Bros. Columbia Pictures	Grammy Award for Best Instrumental Composition ("Superman March"); Grammy Award for Best Album of Original Score Written for a Motion Picture or Television Special; Nominated—Academy Award for Best Original Score; Nominated—Golden Globe Award for Best Original Score; Nominated—Grammy Award for Best Pop Instrumental Performance ("Superman March")
1979	Dracula	John Badham	The Mirisch Company; Universal Pictures	—N/a
1979	1941	Steven Spielberg	A-Team Productions; Universal Pictures (North America); Columbia Pictures (International)	—N/a

=== 1980s ===
Year	Title	Director	Studio	Notes
1980	The Empire Strikes Back	Irvin Kershner	Lucasfilm Ltd. 20th Century Fox	BAFTA Award for Best Film Music; Grammy Award for Best Instrumental Composition (The Empire Strikes Back - Soundtrack); Grammy Award for Best Album of Original Score Written for a Motion Picture or Television Special; Nominated—Academy Award for Best Original Score; Nominated—Golden Globe Award for Best Original Score; Nominated—Grammy Award for Best Instrumental Composition ("The Imperial March"); Nominated—Grammy Award for Best Instrumental Composition ("Yoda's Theme"); Nominated—Grammy Award for Best Pop Instrumental Performance ("Yoda's Theme")
1981	Raiders of the Lost Ark	Steven Spielberg	Lucasfilm Ltd. Paramount Pictures	Grammy Award for Best Album of Original Score Written for a Motion Picture or Television Special; Nominated—Academy Award for Best Original Score; Nominated—BAFTA Award for Best Film Music
1981	Heartbeeps	Allan Arkush	Universal Pictures	—N/a
1982	E.T. The Extra-Terrestrial	Steven Spielberg	Amblin Entertainment; Universal Pictures	Academy Award for Best Original Score; BAFTA Award for Best Film Music; Golden Globe Award for Best Original Score; Grammy Award for Best Instrumental Composition ("Flying Theme from E.T. the Extra-Terrestrial"); Grammy Award for Best Album of Original Score Written for a Motion Picture or Television Special; Grammy Award for Best Arrangement on an Instrumental Recording ("Flying Theme from E.T. the Extra-Terrestrial"); Nominated—Grammy Award for Best Instrumental Composition ("Adventures on Earth"); Nominated—Grammy Award for Best Pop Instrumental Performance (E.T. the Extra-Terrestrial soundtrack)
1982	Yes, Giorgio	Franklin J. Schaffner	Metro-Goldwyn-Mayer; United Artists	Songs only; score composed by Michael J. Lewis; Nominated—Academy Award for Best Original Song ("If We Were In Love," lyrics by Alan & Marilyn Bergman); Nominated—Golden Globe Award for Best Original Song ("If We Were In Love," lyrics by Alan & Marilyn Bergman)
1982	Monsignor	Frank Perry	Frank Yablans Presentations; 20th Century Fox	Nominated—Golden Raspberry Award for Worst Musical Score
1983	Return of the Jedi	Richard Marquand	Lucasfilm Ltd. 20th Century Fox	Nominated—Academy Award for Best Original Score; Nominated—Grammy Award for Best Album of Original Score Written for a Motion Picture or Television Special
1984	Indiana Jones and the Temple of Doom	Steven Spielberg	Lucasfilm Ltd. Paramount Pictures	Nominated—Academy Award for Best Original Score
1984	The River	Mark Rydell	Universal Pictures	Nominated—Academy Award for Best Original Score; Nominated—Golden Globe Award for Best Original Score
1986	SpaceCamp	Harry Winer	ABC Motion Pictures; 20th Century Fox	—N/a
1987	The Witches of Eastwick	George Miller	Guber-Peters Company; Kennedy Miller; Warner Bros.	Nominated—Academy Award for Best Original Score; Nominated—Grammy Award for Best Album of Original Instrumental Background Score Written for a Motion Picture or Television
1987	Empire of the Sun	Steven Spielberg	Amblin Entertainment; Warner Bros.	BAFTA Award for Best Film Music; Nominated—Academy Award for Best Original Score; Nominated—Golden Globe Award for Best Original Score; Nominated—Grammy Award for Best Album of Original Instrumental Background Score Written for a Motion Picture or Television
1987	Superman IV: The Quest for Peace	Sidney J. Furie	The Cannon Group, Inc. Golan-Globus Productions; Warner Bros. Columbia Pictures	Adapted and conducted by Alexander Courage, three new themes
1988	The Accidental Tourist	Lawrence Kasdan	Warner Bros.	Nominated—Academy Award for Best Original Score; Nominated—Golden Globe Award for Best Original Score
1989	Indiana Jones and the Last Crusade	Steven Spielberg	Lucasfilm Ltd. Paramount Pictures	Nominated—Academy Award for Best Original Score; Nominated—Grammy Award for Best Album of Original Instrumental Background Score Written for a Motion Picture or Television
1989	Born on the Fourth of July	Oliver Stone	Ixtlan Productions; Universal Pictures	Nominated—Academy Award for Best Original Score; Nominated—Golden Globe Award for Best Original Score; Nominated—Grammy Award for Best Arrangement on an Instrumental
1989	Always	Steven Spielberg	Amblin Entertainment; Universal Pictures; United Artists	—N/a

=== 1990s ===
Year	Title	Director	Studio	Notes
1990	Stanley & Iris	Martin Ritt	Lantana Productions; Star Partners II Ltd. Metro-Goldwyn-Mayer; United Artists	—N/a
1990	Presumed Innocent	Alan J. Pakula	Mirage Enterprises; Warner Bros.	—N/a
1990	Home Alone	Chris Columbus	Hughes Entertainment; 20th Century Fox	Replaced Bruce Broughton; Nominated—Academy Award for Best Original Score; Nominated—Academy Award for Best Original Song ("Somewhere in My Memory," lyrics by Leslie Bricusse); Nominated—Grammy Award for Best Song Written Specifically for a Motion Picture or Television ("Somewhere in My Memory," lyrics by Leslie Bricusse)
1991	Hook	Steven Spielberg	Amblin Entertainment; TriStar Pictures	Nominated—Academy Award for Best Original Song ("When You're Alone," lyrics by Leslie Bricusse); Nominated—Grammy Award for Best Pop Instrumental Performance; Nominated—Grammy Award for Best Instrumental Composition Written for a Motion Picture or Television
1991	JFK	Oliver Stone	Le Studio Canal+ Regency Enterprises; Alcor Films; Ixtlan Corporation; Warner Bros.	Nominated—Academy Award for Best Original Score
1992	Far and Away	Ron Howard	Imagine Entertainment; Universal Pictures	—N/a
1992	Home Alone 2: Lost in New York	Chris Columbus	Hughes Entertainment; 20th Century Fox	—N/a
1993	Jurassic Park	Steven Spielberg	Universal Pictures; Amblin Entertainment	Nominated—Grammy Award for Best Instrumental Composition Written for a Motion Picture or Television
1993	Schindler's List	Steven Spielberg	Universal Pictures; Amblin Entertainment	Academy Award for Best Original Score; BAFTA Award for Best Film Music; Grammy Award for Best Instrumental Composition Written for a Motion Picture or Television; Nominated—Golden Globe Award for Best Original Score
1995	Sabrina	Sydney Pollack	Mirage Enterprises; Sandollar Productions; Paramount Pictures	Nominated—Academy Award for Best Original Musical or Comedy Score; Nominated—Academy Award for Best Original Song ("Moonlight," lyrics by Alan & Marilyn Bergman); Nominated—Grammy Award for Best Song Written Specifically for a Motion Picture or Television ("Moonlight," lyrics by Alan & Marilyn Bergman)
1995	Nixon	Oliver Stone	Hollywood Pictures; Illusion Entertainment Group; Cinergi Pictures	Nominated—Academy Award for Best Original Dramatic Score
1996	Sleepers	Barry Levinson	PolyGram Filmed Entertainment; Propaganda Films; Baltimore Pictures; Astoria Films; Warner Bros. (North America)	Nominated—Academy Award for Best Original Dramatic Score
1997	Rosewood	John Singleton	Peters Entertainment; New Deal Productions; Warner Bros.	Replaced Wynton Marsalis
1997	The Lost World: Jurassic Park	Steven Spielberg	Universal Pictures; Amblin Entertainment	Nominated—Grammy Award for Best Instrumental Composition Written for a Motion Picture or Television
1997	Seven Years in Tibet	Jean-Jacques Annaud	TriStar Pictures; Mandalay Entertainment; Sony Pictures Releasing (US); Summit Entertainment (International)	Nominated—Golden Globe Award for Best Original Score; Nominated—Grammy Award for Best Instrumental Composition Written for a Motion Picture or Television
1997	Amistad	Steven Spielberg	HBO Films; DreamWorks Pictures	Nominated—Academy Award for Best Original Dramatic Score; Nominated—Grammy Award for Best Instrumental Composition Written for a Motion Picture or Television
1998	Saving Private Ryan	Steven Spielberg	Amblin Entertainment; Mutual Film Company; DreamWorks Pictures; Paramount Pictures	Grammy Award for Best Instrumental Composition Written for a Motion Picture or Television; Nominated—Academy Award for Best Original Dramatic Score; Nominated—BAFTA Award for Best Film Music; Nominated—Golden Globe Award for Best Original Score
1998	Stepmom	Chris Columbus	Columbia Pictures; 1492 Pictures	Replaced Patrick Doyle
1999	Star Wars: Episode I – The Phantom Menace	George Lucas	Lucasfilm Ltd. 20th Century Fox	Nominated—Grammy Award for Best Instrumental Composition Written for a Motion Picture, Television, or Other Visual Media
1999	Angela's Ashes	Alan Parker	Paramount Pictures; Universal Pictures; Scott Rudin Productions; David Brown Productions; Dirty Hands Productions	Grammy Award for Best Instrumental Composition (Theme from Angela's Ashes); Nominated—Academy Award for Best Original Score; Nominated—Golden Globe Award for Best Original Score

=== 2000s ===
Year	Title	Director	Studio	Notes
2000	The Patriot	Roland Emmerich	Columbia Pictures; Centropolis Entertainment; Mutual Film Company	Nominated—Academy Award for Best Original Score
2001	A.I. Artificial Intelligence	Steven Spielberg	DreamWorks Pictures; Amblin Entertainment; Stanley Kubrick Productions; Warner Bros. Pictures (North America)	Nominated—Academy Award for Best Original Score; Nominated—Golden Globe Award for Best Original Score; Nominated—Grammy Award for Best Score Soundtrack Album for a Motion Picture, Television, or Other Visual Media
2001	Harry Potter and the Philosopher's Stone	Chris Columbus	Warner Bros. Pictures; Heyday Films; 1492 Pictures	Released in the US as Harry Potter and the Sorcerer's Stone; Nominated—Academy Award for Best Original Score; Nominated—Grammy Award for Best Instrumental Composition ("Hedwig's Theme"); Nominated—Grammy Award for Best Score Soundtrack Album for a Motion Picture, Television, or Other Visual Media
2002	Star Wars: Episode II – Attack of the Clones	George Lucas	Lucasfilm Ltd. 20th Century Fox	—N/a
2002	Minority Report	Steven Spielberg	20th Century Fox; DreamWorks Pictures; Amblin Entertainment; Blue Tulip Productions	—N/a
2002	Harry Potter and the Chamber of Secrets	Chris Columbus	Warner Bros. Pictures; Heyday Films; 1492 Pictures	Adapted and conducted by William Ross; Nominated—Grammy Award for Best Score Soundtrack Album for a Motion Picture, Television, or Other Visual Media
2002	Catch Me If You Can	Steven Spielberg	Amblin Entertainment; DreamWorks Pictures; Parkes/MacDonald Productions; Kemp Company; Splendid Pictures	Grammy Award for Best Instrumental Arrangement ("Escapades" for Alto Saxophone and Orchestra - 2017); Nominated—Academy Award for Best Original Score; Nominated—BAFTA Award for Best Film Music; Nominated—Grammy Award for Best Score Soundtrack Album for a Motion Picture, Television, or Other Visual Media
2004	Harry Potter and the Prisoner of Azkaban	Alfonso Cuarón	Warner Bros. Pictures; Heyday Films; 1492 Pictures	Williams' final score for a Harry Potter film Nominated—Academy Award for Best Original Score; Nominated—Grammy Award for Best Score Soundtrack Album for a Motion Picture, Television, or Other Visual Media
2004	The Terminal	Steven Spielberg	Amblin Entertainment; DreamWorks Pictures; Parkes/MacDonald Productions	—N/a
2005	Star Wars: Episode III – Revenge of the Sith	George Lucas	Lucasfilm Ltd. 20th Century Fox	Nominated—Grammy Award for Best Instrumental Composition ("Anakin's Betrayal"); Nominated—Grammy Award for Best Score Soundtrack Album for a Motion Picture, Television, or Other Visual Media
2005	War of the Worlds	Steven Spielberg	Paramount Pictures; DreamWorks Pictures; Amblin Entertainment; Cruise/Wagner Productions	Nominated—Grammy Award for Best Instrumental Composition ("The Ferry Scene")
2005	Memoirs of a Geisha	Rob Marshall	Columbia Pictures; DreamWorks Pictures; Spyglass Entertainment; Amblin Entertainment; Red Wagon Entertainment	BAFTA Award for Best Film Music; Golden Globe Award for Best Original Score; Grammy Award for Best Score Soundtrack Album for a Motion Picture, Television, or Other Visual Media; Nominated—Academy Award for Best Original Score; Nominated—Grammy Award for Best Instrumental Composition ("Sayuri's Theme and End Credits")
2005	Munich	Steven Spielberg	Amblin Entertainment; The Kennedy/Marshall Company; Alliance Atlantis; Universal Pictures (US); DreamWorks Pictures (International)	Grammy Award for Best Instrumental Composition ("A Prayer for Peace"); Nominated—Academy Award for Best Original Score; Nominated—Grammy Award for Best Score Soundtrack Album for a Motion Picture, Television, or Other Visual Media
2008	Indiana Jones and the Kingdom of the Crystal Skull	Steven Spielberg	Lucasfilm Ltd. Paramount Pictures	Grammy Award for Best Instrumental Composition ("The Adventures of Mutt"); Nominated—Grammy Award for Best Score Soundtrack Album for a Motion Picture, Television, or Other Visual Media

=== 2010s ===
Year	Title	Director	Studio	Notes
2011	The Adventures of Tintin	Steven Spielberg	Paramount Pictures; Nickelodeon Movies; Columbia Pictures; Amblin Entertainment; WingNut Films; The Kennedy/Marshall Company; Hemisphere Media Capital	First score for an animated film Annie Award for Music in a Feature Production; Nominated—Academy Award for Best Original Score; Nominated—Grammy Award for Best Score Soundtrack for Visual Media
2011	War Horse	Steven Spielberg	DreamWorks Pictures; Touchstone Pictures; Reliance Entertainment; Amblin Entertainment; The Kennedy/Marshall Company; Walt Disney Studios Motion Pictures	Nominated—Academy Award for Best Original Score; Nominated—BAFTA Award for Best Film Music; Nominated—Golden Globe Award for Best Original Score
2012	Lincoln	Steven Spielberg	DreamWorks Pictures; Touchstone Pictures; 20th Century Fox; Participant Media; Reliance Entertainment; Dune Entertainment; Amblin Entertainment; The Kennedy/Marshall Company; Walt Disney Studios Motion Pictures (United States and Canada)	Nominated—Academy Award for Best Original Score; Nominated—BAFTA Award for Best Film Music; Nominated—Golden Globe Award for Best Original Score; Nominated—Grammy Award for Best Score Soundtrack for Visual Media
2013	The Book Thief	Brian Percival	Fox 2000 Pictures; Sunswept Entertainment; Studio Babelsberg; 20th Century Fox	Grammy Award for Best Instrumental Composition ("The Book Thief"); Nominated—Academy Award for Best Original Score; Nominated—BAFTA Award for Best Film Music; Nominated—Golden Globe Award for Best Original Score
2015	Star Wars: The Force Awakens	J. J. Abrams	Lucasfilm Ltd. Walt Disney Studios Motion Pictures; Bad Robot	Grammy Award for Best Score Soundtrack for Visual Media; Nominated—Academy Award for Best Original Score; Nominated—BAFTA Award for Best Film Music
2016	The BFG	Steven Spielberg	Walt Disney Pictures; Amblin Entertainment; Reliance Entertainment; Walden Media; The Kennedy/Marshall Company; Mister Smith Entertainment	—N/a
2017	Dear Basketball	Glen Keane	Granity Studios; Believe Entertainment Group; Glen Keane Productions	Short film
2017	Star Wars: The Last Jedi	Rian Johnson	Lucasfilm Ltd. Walt Disney Studios Motion Pictures	Nominated—Academy Award for Best Original Score; Nominated—Grammy Award for Best Score Soundtrack for Visual Media
2017	The Post	Steven Spielberg	20th Century Fox; DreamWorks Pictures; Participant Media; Amblin Entertainment; Amblin Partners; Pascal Pictures; Star Thrower Entertainment; Mister Smith Entertainment	Nominated—Golden Globe Award for Best Original Score
2018	Solo: A Star Wars Story	Ron Howard	Lucasfilm Ltd. Walt Disney Studios Motion Pictures	Credited for Han Solo theme and original Star Wars music Score composed and adapted by John Powell; Nominated—Grammy Award for Best Instrumental Composition ("Mine Mission," shared with John Powell)
2019	Star Wars: The Rise of Skywalker	J. J. Abrams	Lucasfilm Ltd. Walt Disney Studios Motion Pictures; Bad Robot	Williams's final score for a Star Wars film Nominated—Academy Award for Best Original Score; Nominated—BAFTA Award for Best Film Music; Nominated—Grammy Award for Best Score Soundtrack for Visual Media

=== 2020s ===
Year	Title	Director	Studio	Notes
2022	The Fabelmans	Steven Spielberg	Amblin Entertainment; Reliance Entertainment; Universal Pictures	Nominated—Academy Award for Best Original Score; Nominated—Golden Globe Award for Best Original Score; Nominated—Grammy Award for Best Score Soundtrack for Visual Media
2023	Indiana Jones and the Dial of Destiny	James Mangold	Walt Disney Pictures; Lucasfilm Ltd. Paramount Pictures	Williams's final score for an Indiana Jones film Grammy Award for Best Instrumental Composition ("Helena's Theme"); Nominated—Academy Award for Best Original Score; Nominated—Grammy Award for Best Score Soundtrack for Visual Media
2026	Disclosure Day	Steven Spielberg	Amblin Entertainment; Universal Pictures	

== The Olympics ==
Williams has composed music for four Olympic Games:

- "Olympic Fanfare and Theme" – 1984 Summer Olympics, Los Angeles
  Written specifically for the opening ceremonies. In a 1996 re-release, the opening trumpet fanfare was replaced with "Bugler's Dream", a previous Olympic Theme written by Leo Arnaud. This recording has been used as the theme for NBC's Olympic coverage ever since. Williams received a Grammy for Best Instrumental Composition.
- "The Olympic Spirit" – 1988 Summer Olympics, Seoul
  Commissioned by NBC Sports for their television coverage. Williams received a Grammy nomination for Best Instrumental Composition.
- "Summon the Heroes" – 1996 Summer Olympics, Atlanta, Georgia
  Written in commemoration of the Centennial of the Modern Olympic Games. Premiering on July 19, 1996, the piece features heavy use of the brass and wind sections and is approximately six minutes in length. Principal Boston Pops trumpeter Timothy Morrison played the opening solo on the album recording. It has been arranged for various types of ensembles, including wind ensembles. This theme is now used prevalently by NBC for intros and outros to commercial breaks of the Olympics.
- "Call of the Champions" – 2002 Winter Olympics, Salt Lake City, Utah

== Television ==
Year	Title	Network	Notes
1958	Playhouse 90	CBS	Episode: "The Right Hand Man"
1958–1959	M Squad	NBC	—N/a
1958–1964	Wagon Train	NBC; ABC	—N/a
1959	Markham	CBS	Episode: "Woman of Arles"
1959–1960	Bachelor Father	CBS; NBC; ABC	—N/a
1960	Tales of Wells Fargo	NBC	—N/a
1960–1962	Checkmate	CBS	Theme; Nominated—Grammy Award for Best Score Soundtrack for Visual Media
1960–1962	General Electric Theater	CBS	Episodes: "Ten Days in the Sun" and "Journal of Hope"
1961	Kraft Mystery Theatre	NBC	—N/a
1961–1963	Alcoa Premiere	ABC	Theme
1962–1963	Wide Country	NBC	Theme
1963	The Eleventh Hour	NBC	Episode: "The Bronze Locust"
1963–1965	Kraft Suspense Theatre	NBC	Theme
1963–1967	Bob Hope Presents the Chrysler Theatre	NBC	Theme
1964	Breaking Point	ABC	Episode: "Better Than a Dead Lion"
1964–1965	Gilligan's Island	CBS	Episode: pilot
1965	Ben Casey	ABC	Episode: "A Little Fun to Match the Sorrow"
1965	Lost in Space	CBS	Theme; Episodes: "My Friend, Mr. Nobody", The Hungry Sea", "Island in the Sky" and "The Reluctant Stowaway"
1966	The Tammy Grimes Show	ABC	Theme; Episode: "How to Steal a Girl Even If It's Only Me"
1966–1968	The Time Tunnel	ABC	Theme; Episode: "Rendezvous with Yesterday"
1968	Land of the Giants	ABC	Episode: "The Crash"
1968	CBS Playhouse	CBS	Episode: "Saturday Adoption"
1976	48th Academy Awards	ABC	Musical director
1981–2005	Evening at Pops	PBS	Theme
1985–1987	Amazing Stories	NBC	Theme; Episodes: "The Mission" and "Ghost Train"
2009	Great Performances	PBS	Theme
2022	Obi-Wan Kenobi	Disney+	Theme; Score composed by Natalie Holt; Theme adapted by William Ross

- For NBC (United States):
  - NBC News – "The Mission"
    - NBC Nightly News
    - The Today Show
    - Meet the Press
  - NBC Sunday Night Football

== Concertos ==
Composition Year	Title	Premiere date	Premiere Performers	Notes
1969	Concerto for Flute and Orchestra	1981	Leonard Slatkin/St. Louis Symphony Orchestra – Peter Lloyd, flute – St. Louis	
1976	Concerto for Violin and Orchestra	1981-01-29	Leonard Slatkin/St. Louis Symphony Orchestra – Mark Peskanov, violin – St. Louis	Composed at the suggestion of Barbara Ruick, first wife of the composer. Begun in 1974, shortly after Ruick's death, and completed in 1976
1985	Concerto for Tuba and Orchestra	1985-05-08	John Williams/Boston Pops Orchestra – Chester Schmitz, tuba – Boston	Composed in 1985 for the Centennial of the Boston Pops
1991	Concerto for Clarinet and Orchestra	1991-04-13	John Williams/Riverside County Philharmonic – Michele Zukovsky, clarinet – Los Angeles	Composed in 1991 for Michele Zukovsky, principal clarinet of the LA Philharmonic
1993	Concerto for Bassoon and Orchestra (The Five Sacred Trees)	1995-04-15	Kurt Masur/New York Philharmonic – Judith LeClair, bassoon	Composed in 1993 for the 150th celebration of the New York Philharmonic
1994	Concerto for Cello and Orchestra	1994-07-07	John Williams/Boston Symphony Orchestra – Yo-Yo Ma, cello – Tanglewood	Composed in 1994 for the opening of the Seiji Ozawa Hall in Tanglewood
1996	Concerto for Trumpet and Orchestra	1996-10	Christoph von Dohnányi/Cleveland Orchestra – Michael Sachs, trumpet	Composed in 1996 for Michael Sachs, first trumpet of the Cleveland Orchestra
1997 rev. 2002	Elegy for Cello and Orchestra		Premiered by John Williams, piano, and John Waltz, cello. Later arranged for cello and orchestra	Composed in 1997 for a memorial service in Los Angeles. Based on a secondary theme from Seven Years in Tibet
2000	TreeSong for Violin and Orchestra	2000-07-08	John Williams/Boston Symphony Orchestra – Gil Shaham, violin	Composed in 2000 for Gil Shaham
2001	Heartwood: Lyric Sketches for Cello and Orchestra	2002-08-04	John Williams/Boston Symphony Orchestra – Yo-Yo Ma, cello – Boston	Composed in 2001 for Yo-Yo Ma
2003	Concerto for Horn and Orchestra	2003-11-29	John Williams/Chicago Symphony Orchestra – Dale Clevenger, horn – Chicago	Composed for the Chicago Symphony Orchestra's principal horn Dale Clevenger
2007	Duo Concertante for Violin and Viola	2007-08-17	John Williams/Boston Pops Orchestra – Victor Romanul, violin – Michael Zaretsky, viola – Tanglewood	Composed for Michael Zaretsky
2009	Concerto for Viola and Orchestra	2009-05-26	John Williams/Boston Symphony Orchestra – Boston	Composed for Cathy Basrak. Unreleased
2009	On Willows and Birches (Concerto for Harp and Orchestra)	2009-09-23	John Williams/Boston Symphony Orchestra – Boston	Composed for Ann Hobson Pilot
2011	Concerto for Oboe and Orchestra	2011-05-25	John Williams/Boston Pops Orchestra – Keisuke Wakao, oboe – Boston	Composed for Keisuke Wakao
2014	Prelude and Scherzo for Piano and Orchestra	2014-07-03	China Philharmonic Orchestra – Lang Lang, piano – Beijing	Composed for the Music in the Summer Air Festival
2017	Markings for solo violin, strings, and harp	2017-07-16	Andris Nelsons/Boston Symphony Orchestra – Anne-Sophie Mutter, violin – Tanglewood	Composed for Anne-Sophie Mutter
2018	Highwood's Ghost, An Encounter for Cello, Harp and Orchestra	2018-08-19	Andris Nelsons/Boston Symphony Orchestra – Yo-Yo Ma, cello – Jessica Zhou, harp – Tanglewood	Composed for Yo-Yo Ma and Jessica Zhou
2021	Violin Concerto No. 2	2021-07-24	John Williams/Boston Symphony Orchestra – Anne-Sophie Mutter, violin – Tanglewood	Composed for Anne-Sophie Mutter
2025	Piano Concerto	2025-07-26	Andris Nelsons/Boston Symphony Orchestra – Emanuel Ax, Piano – Tanglewood	Composed for Emanuel Ax

== Celebration pieces and other concert works ==
- "Prelude and Fugue for Orchestra" (1965). Premiered by the Los Angeles Neophonic Orchestra conducted by Stan Kenton. The original Kenton version is on the album Stan Kenton Conducts the Los Angeles Neophonic Orchestra. Another recording is available for download in MP3 at the United States Marine Band website.
- "Essay for Strings" (1965)
- "Symphony No. 1" (1966), premiered by Houston Symphony under André Previn in 1968. Williams reworked the piece in 1988 (scheduled to be performed by the San Francisco Symphony during a visit as guest conductor in early 1990s but pulled before the performance).
- "Sinfonietta for Wind Ensemble" (1968), commissioned and first recorded in 1970 by Eastman Wind Ensemble under Donald Hunsberger.
- "A Nostalgic Jazz Odyssey" (1971)
- Thomas and The King (musical, 1975), premiered in London. Recorded in 1981 by the Original Cast.
- "Jubilee 350 Fanfare" (1980), premiered by the Boston Pops conducted by Williams. Piece celebrating the 350th anniversary of the City of Boston
- "Fanfare for a Festive Occasion" (1980), composed for by the Boston Civic Orchestra and its conductor Max Hobart, and premiered on November 14, 1980.
- "Pops on the March" (1981). Composed as a tribute to Arthur Fiedler
- "America, the Dream Goes On" (1982)
- "Esplanade Overture" (1983)
- Liberty Fanfare (1986), premiered on July 4, 1986, by the Boston Pops Esplanade Orchestra. Piece composed for the Liberty Weekend Centennial of the Statue of Liberty
- "Celebration Fanfare" (1986). Composed for the sesquicentennial of the Texas Declaration of Independence
- "A Hymn to New England" (1987)
- "We're Looking Good!" (1987). Composed for the 1987 Special Olympics World Games
- "Fanfare for Michael Dukakis" (1988). Composed for Michael Dukakis' presidential campaign and premiered at the 1988 Democratic National Convention
- "Fanfare for Ten-Year-Olds" (1988)
- "For New York" (Variations on theme by Leonard Bernstein) (1988). Composed for Leonard Bernstein's 70th birthday celebrations
- "Winter Games Fanfare" (1989)
- "Celebrate Discovery!" (1990). Composed for the 500th anniversary celebration of the arrival of Columbus in America
- "Aloft... To the Royal Masthead" (1992), for the visiting Prince Philip, Duke of Edinburgh.
- "Sound the Bells!" (1993), composed in honor of the wedding of Crown Prince Naruhito and Crown Princess Masako.
- "Song for World Peace" (1994)
- "Variations on Happy Birthday" (1995)
- "Satellite Celebration" (1995)
- "Seven for Luck" (1998)
- "American Journey" (1999). Portions premiered as accompaniment to a film by Steven Spielberg as part of the Millennium Celebration in Washington D.C. December 31, 1999
- "For Seiji!" (1999). Tribute to conductor Seiji Ozawa, premiered by the Boston Symphony Orchestra on April 23, 1999
- "Three Pieces for Solo Cello" (2001)
- "Soundings" (2003), composed for the Walt Disney Concert Hall
- "Star Spangled Banner" (2007), special arrangement for game 1 of the 2007 World Series played by the Boston Pops Orchestra
- "A Timeless Call" (2008). Score to the Steven Spielberg war veteran tribute film shown on day 3 of the 2008 Democratic National Convention
- "Air and Simple Gifts", performed by Itzhak Perlman on violin, Yo-Yo Ma on cello, Gabriela Montero on piano, and Anthony McGill on clarinet. Composed for the Barack Obama 2009 presidential inauguration
- "Viktor's Tale" (2010), for clarinet and concert band. From The Terminal.
- "La Jolla Quartet: A Chamber Piece for Violin, Cello, Clarinet, and Harp" (2011). Premiered August 2011 at the La Jolla Music Society's SummerFest
- "A Young Person's Guide to the Cello" for solo cello (2011)
- "Fanfare for Fenway" (2012), Premiered April 2012 as part of the Boston Red Sox's commemoration of their 100th anniversary in Fenway Park.
- "Rounds" (2012), for solo guitar - Composed for Spanish guitarist Pablo Sáinz Villegas and premiered in June 2012 at the Parkening International Guitar Competition in Malibu.
- "Fanfare for 'The President's Own'" (2013), Premiered May 2013 for the United States Marine Band's 215th anniversary.
- "Conversations" (2013), a four-movement work for solo piano. The first two movements were premiered by pianist Gloria Cheng on July 22, 2013, at the Mendocino Music Festival in California. She premiered the entire work in November on the Piano Spheres series in Los Angeles. A recording of "Conversations" was released on February 10, 2015, as part of Gloria Cheng's solo album 'Montage'.
- "Music for Brass" for Brass Ensemble and Percussion (2014), premiered on June 12 by the National Brass Ensemble.
- "A Toast!" (2014), celebrating the arrival of Andris Nelsons as new music director of the Boston Symphony Orchestra.
- "Just Down West Street...on the left" (2015), Tanglewood Music Center 75th Anniversary commission.
- Theme and ambient music for Star Wars: Galaxy's Edge attractions (2018–2019)
- "Overture to the Oscars", premiered at Tanglewood's 'Film Night' 2021 (August 13)
- "Fanfare for Solo Trumpet", composed for David Geffen Hall Reopening (2022)
- "Centennial Overture", composed in celebration of the 100th Anniversary of the Hollywood Bowl (2022)
- "Of Grit and Glory", composed for ESPN College Football Championship (2023)

== Bibliography ==
- "John Williams Compositions". johnwilliams.org.
