= Empire of the Sun (soundtrack) =

Film score by John Williams
- Released: December 9, 1987 (original version), June 24, 2014 (expanded version)
- Recorded: 1987
- Genre: Soundtrack
- Length: 54:11 (original version), 108:29 (expanded version)
- Label: Warner Bros.

John Williams chronology
The Witches of Eastwick (1987)	Empire of the Sun (1987)	The Accidental Tourist (1988)

Professional ratings
Review scores
Source	Rating
AllMusic	3/5 stars
Filmtracks	3/5 stars

Empire of the Sun is the soundtrack, on Warner Bros. Records, of the 1987 film Empire of the Sun. The original score was composed and conducted by John Williams, performed by the Hollywood Studio Symphony and recorded during September and October 1987.

The album is a 54-minute selection of music from the film, but the order of the track listing does not follow the film's chronology.

The album won the BAFTA Award for Best Film Music. It was also nominated for the Academy Award for Best Original Score, the Golden Globe Award for Best Original Score and the Grammy Award for Best Score Soundtrack for Visual Media.

A version of the track "Jim's New Life," performed by the Boston Pops Orchestra, was included on the 1995 album Williams on Williams: The Classic Spielberg Scores. A Boston Pops Orchestra version of "Cadillac of the Skies" is on disc one of the 1999 double album John Williams Greatest Hits 1969–1999.

A limited edition, two-disc edition of the Empire of the Sun soundtrack, produced and remastered by Mike Matessino, was released by La-La Land Records in 2014. This edition of the soundtrack runs twice as long as the original album. The first disc contains a full presentation of the film score, including previously unreleased music, and the second disc features a selection of alternate cues and other additional music.

== Track listing (original 1987 album) ==
1. "Suo Gân" 2:19
2. "Cadillac of the Skies" 3:48
3. "Jim's New Life" 2:33
4. "Lost in the Crowd" 5:39
5. "Imaginary Air Battle" 2:35
6. "The Return to the City" 7:45
7. "Liberation: Exsultate Justi" 1:46
8. "The British Grenadiers" (traditional) 2:25
9. "Toy Planes, Home and Hearth" (Chopin Mazurka Opus 17 No. 4) 4:37
10. "The Streets of Shanghai" 5:11
11. "The Pheasant Hunt" 4:24
12. "No Road Home/Seeing the Bomb" 6:10
13. "Exsultate Justi" 4:59

"Suo Gân" performed by the Ambrosian Junior Choir (director: John McCarthy, soloist: James Rainbird).

All tracks written by John Williams, except "Suo Gân" (traditional/Robert Bryan), "The British Grenadiers" (traditional), and "Chopin Mazurka Opus 17 No. 4" (Frédéric Chopin).

== Track listing (2014 Expanded Archival Collection edition) ==
=== Disc one ===
1. "Suo Gan" (extended version)** 3:29
2. "Home and Hearth"** 3:50
3. "Trip Through the Crowd" 2:33
4. "Imaginary Air Battle" 2:38
5. "Japanese Infantry"* 3:00
6. "Lost in the Crowd" 5:44
7. "Alone at Home"* 2:43
8. "The Empty Swimming Pool"* 3:14
9. "The Streets of Shanghai" 5:15
10. "The Plane" 3:15
11. "Jim's New Life" 2:34
12. "The Pheasant Hunt" 4:28
13. "The British Grenadiers" (Traditional) 2:29
14. "Cadillac of the Skies" 3:53
15. "Mrs. Victor and James"* 2:11
16. "The Return to the City" 7:50
17. "Seeing the Bomb"** 4:48
18. "Bringing Them Back"* 2:41
19. "Liberation: Exsultate Justi" 1:53
20. "Suo Gân" 2:23
21. "Exsultate Justi" (extended version)** 5:14

=== Disc two ===
1. Chopin: "Mazurka, Op. 17 No. 4" (excerpt)* 2:14
2. "Imaginary Air Battle" (alternate)* 2:41
3. "Alone at Home" (alternate)* 2: 40
4. "The Streets of Shanghai" (film version segment)* 1:18
5. "The Streets of Shanghai" (alternate segment)* 2:17
6. "Chopin Again"* 1:19
7. "The Plane" (alternate)* 3:05
8. "Cadillac of the Skies" (alternate)* 3:51
9. "The Return to the City" (alternate)* 7:50
10. "Exsultate Justi" (album version) 5:09

(*) Previously unreleased, (**) contains previously unreleased music

Tracks from the original album not present on the expanded version are "Toy Planes, Home and Hearth" (included as the separate cues "The Plane" and "Home and Hearth") and "No Road Home/Seeing the Bomb" (included as the separate cues "Trip Through the Crowd" and "Seeing the Bomb").
