= American Journey =

Six-part orchestral composition by John Williams

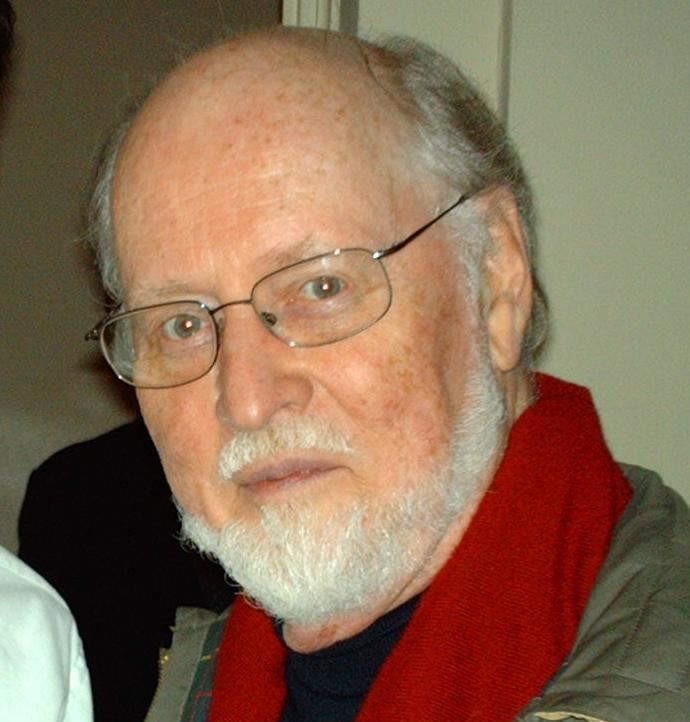
John Williams in 2006

American Journey (originally titled The Unfinished Journey) is a six-part orchestral composition by the American composer John Williams. The piece was commissioned by U.S. President Bill Clinton to accompany a multimedia presentation titled The Unfinished Journey directed by Steven Spielberg for the 2000 Millennium celebrations. The work premiered at the Lincoln Memorial in Washington, D.C. on New Year's Eve, 1999.

== Composition ==
=== Structure ===
Lasting approximately 25 minutes in performance, American Journey is composed in six short movements played without pause:

1. "Immigration and Building"
2. "The Country at War"
3. "Popular Entertainment"
4. "Arts and Sports"
5. "Civil Rights and the Women's Movement"
6. "Flight and Technology"

=== Style and influences ===
The first movement, "Immigration and Building," contains quotes from Williams' score to the 1992 film Far and Away. Additionally, the style of the music would heavily anticipate his score to the 2000 film The Patriot.

=== Instrumentation ===
American Journey is scored for three flutes (II doubling on Irish flute, III doubling on piccolo), two oboes, English horn, three clarinets (III doubling on bass clarinet), three bassoons (III doubling on contrabassoon), six French horns, four trumpets, four trombones, tuba, timpani, percussion (bass drum, chimes, cymbals, field drum, orchestral bells, small triangle, snare drum, suspended cymbal, tambourine, tamtam, triangle, vibraphone, xylophone), harp, piano, and strings (violins I & II, violas, violoncellos, and double basses) with optional accompaniment by two narrators.

== Reception ==
The film music critic James Southall said of the work, "...it's fantastic music. At times reminiscent of some of his film music, it's still wonderfully bracing and vividly descriptive music." Christian Clemmensen of Filmtracks was slightly more critical of the piece, saying, "Even within the United States, Williams' style is distinctly tied to the East Coast, with the bulk of his efforts in tribute to New England, New York and the traditions of music unique in those regions of the country. The 'American Journey' suite has nothing, for instance, to musically represent California or the Rocky Mountain region." Despite this criticism, Clemmensen nevertheless called the work "wholesome, entertaining music."

== Discography ==
A recording of American Journey was released January 15, 2002 on a compilation album by Sony Classical Records. The album also featured Williams' 1996 and 2002 Olympic themes, the NBC Nightly News theme The Mission, For New York, and various other celebratory works and fanfares for orchestra.

== See also ==
- List of compositions by John Williams
