= Call of the Champions =

Single by John Williams

from the album American Journey
- Released: 2002
- Recorded: The Great Salt Lake Tabernacle, Salt Lake City, US
- Genre: Classical
- Length: 4:54
- Label: Sony Records; Olympic Studios
- Songwriter: John Williams
- Producer: John Williams

John Williams singles chronology
"Summon the Heroes" (1996)	"Call of the Champions" (2002)	"Catch Me If You Can" (2002)

"Call of the Champions"
composed by John Williams for the 2002 Winter Olympics in Salt Lake City

Call of the Champions is a cantata-fanfare for orchestra and choir composed by John Williams for the 2002 Winter Olympics in Salt Lake City, Utah. Premiering at the Opening Ceremony on February 8, 2002, it began with the call by the Tabernacle Choir at Temple Square of "Citius! Altius! Fortius!" (Faster, Higher, Stronger), which is the Olympic Motto chosen by the founder of the modern Games, Baron Pierre de Coubertin. Williams added another Latin word as well: "Clarius," meaning "clearer."

The recording of this theme heard during the 2002 Winter Games was made November 27, 2001 in Maurice Abravanel Hall in Salt Lake City, with the composer conducting the Utah Symphony Orchestra and the 360-voice Tabernacle Choir at Temple Square.

Because of differing opinions on the pronunciation of the Latin text, the Choir actually recorded several versions, leaving the final decision to be made by the producers. The issue was whether to use a Classical pronunciation of the Olympic Motto (kitty-us, alty-us, forty-us), a liturgical one (cheetsy-oos, ahltsy-oos, fortsy-oos), or a hybrid of the two (chitty-us, etc.).

In addition to the text variations, the choir and orchestra also recorded two versions of the theme for timing purposes. The full-length, five-minute version appears on the John Williams CD American Journey and in the Tabernacle Choir's own recording on Spirit of America (with the Orchestra at Temple Square) and is the one performed by the Tabernacle Choir at Temple Square and the Orchestra at Temple Square in their concerts. A shorter version, about half the length of the original, was recorded for the Opening Ceremony of the Games. In addition, the theme was repeated throughout the games. A common occurrence was during medal ceremonies where the theme played during the presentation portion of the ceremony.

The work is Williams' fourth composition for the Olympics, after 1984's "Olympic Fanfare and Theme," 1988's "The Olympic Spirit," and 1996's "Summon the Heroes."

This song was used at the 2004 Summer Olympics in Athens, Greece as the torch was brought into the stadium during the opening ceremony.

== See also ==
- List of compositions by John Williams
