= John Williams Greatest Hits 1969–1999 =

John Williams Greatest Hits 1969-1999

Greatest hits album by John Williams
- Released: November 1999
- Genre: Film score, Classical
- Length: 144:02
- Label: Sony Classical

John Williams Greatest Hits 1969–1999 is a compilation of concert suites from various films John Williams has scored between 1969 and 1999. The album contains takes from various orchestras including the London Symphony Orchestra, the Boston Pops Orchestra, the Skywalker Symphony Orchestra, the Boston Symphony Orchestra, and the Hollywood Studio Symphony.

== Track listing ==
=== Disc 1 ===
1. "Star Wars - Main Title" – 5:44
2. "E.T. - Flying Theme" – 3:42
3. "Superman - Main Title" – 4:25
4. "Indiana Jones and the Temple of Doom - Parade of the Slave Children" – 4:53
5. "Sugarland Express - Theme" – 3:35
6. "Jaws - Theme" – 2:31
7. "Olympic Games Fanfare and Theme" – 4:28
8. "Return of the Jedi - Luke and Leia" – 5:02
9. "The Reivers - Main Title" – 5:13
10. "The Empire Strikes Back - The Imperial March" – 3:04
11. "Indiana Jones and the Last Crusade - Scherzo for Motorcycle and Orchestra" – 2:48
12. "Empire of the Sun - Cadillac of the Skies" – 4:58
13. "Raiders of the Lost Ark - The Raider's March (End Credits)" – 5:11
14. "Close Encounters of the Third Kind - Suite" – 9:46
- Total Disc Time: 66:11

=== Disc 2 ===
1. "Saving Private Ryan - Hymn to the Fallen" – 6:10
2. "Jurassic Park - Theme" – 5:29
3. "Schindler's List - Theme" – 3:32
4. "Hook - Flight to Neverland" – 4:41
5. "Seven Years in Tibet - Seven Years in Tibet" – 7:09
6. "JFK - Prologue" – 4:00
7. "Stepmom - The Days Between" – 6:27
8. "1941 - March" – 4:14
9. "Home Alone - Somewhere in My Memory" – 4:54
10. "Summon the Heroes" – 6:14
11. "Rosewood - Look Down, Lord" – 4:12
12. "Far and Away - Theme" – 5:34
13. "Born on the Fourth of July - Theme" – 6:20
14. "Star Wars: Episode I – The Phantom Menace - Duel of the Fates" – 4:14
- Total Disc Time: 73:41
- Total Time: 144:02

== Reception ==
- Tracks 1.2, 1.6, 2.1 and 2.3 are all from works which won an Academy Award. Tracks 1.3, 1.4, 1.8, 1.10, 1.12, 1.14, 2.6, 2.9 and 2.13 are all from works which were nominated for an Academy Award.
- Tracks 1.1, 1.2 and 1.6 are all from works which won a Golden Globe Award.
- Tracks 1.1, 1.2, 1.3, 1.10 and 1.14 are all from works which won a Grammy Award.
- Tracks 1.1, 1.2, 1.6, 1.10, 1.12 and 2.3 are all from works which won a BAFTA Award.
- Tracks 1.2 and 1.13 are from works which won a Saturn Award.
- In 2013, the radio station ABC Classic FM held a Classic 100 Music in the Movies countdown, voted by the public. On the list were tracks 1.1, 1.2, 1.3, 1.4, 2.2 and 2.3.
- Tracks 1.1, 1.2 and 1.6 are all from works which were included on the list of AFI's 100 Years of Film Scores.
