= Summon the Heroes =

1996 orchestral composition by John Williams

Single by John Williams

from the album Summon the Heroes
- Released: July 19, 1996 (1996 Summer Olympics)
- Venue: Avery Fisher Hall, New York City, US
- Genre: Classical
- Length: 6:17
- Label: NBC
- Songwriter: John Williams
- Producer: John Williams

John Williams singles chronology
"The Olympic Spirit" (1988)	"Summon the Heroes" (1996)	"Call of the Champions" (2002)

Summon the Heroes is a one-movement orchestral composition written for the 1996 Summer Olympics by American composer John Williams for the National Broadcasting Company (NBC). It premiered on July 19, 1996, in abridged form, at the opening ceremony in Atlanta, Georgia, played by the Atlanta Symphony Orchestra and conducted by Williams. The piece is the third of four compositions he has written for the Olympics, following 1984's Olympic Fanfare and Theme and 1988's Olympic Spirit, and preceding 2002's Call of the Champions.

== Composition and performances ==
Summon the Heroes is scored for a full orchestra. It is in the key of C major and is marked at 80 beats per minute, lasting about six minutes. The piece is dedicated to Tim Morrison, trumpet soloist of the Boston Pops Orchestra.

Music journalist Jon Burlingame described the piece as having "antiphonal brass choirs" and added that it was "longer and more complex" than Williams' previous Olympic compositions. Christian Clemmensen of Filmtracks noted "Roman and Greek-like historical appeal" in the brass writing that the work "featured with nobility." Musicologist Margaret Dilling compared the piece to Williams's previous Olympic works, noting their common elements including an opening fanfare, theme performed by solo or soli trumpet, and a penultimate "galloping bolero-type ostinato" leading to a "grand-slam finale."

It was played in full on the album Summon the Heroes by the Boston Pops Orchestra, released April 30, 1996. The piece was played at the 1996 Summer Olympics on July 19 by the Atlanta Symphony Orchestra, in an abridged form lasting three-and-a-half minutes, and conducted by Williams.

== Reception ==
In reviewing Summon the Heroes on the 2002 album American Journey (featuring an eponymous composition and the 2002 Olympic theme Call of the Champions, among other Williams' pieces), film music critic James Southall highly praised the work, saying that it "...manages to offer in six minutes the kind of development and depth that simply isn't possible in the shorter tracks that have come before." Southall added, "For my money it's Williams's best concert piece, and maybe his best piece period." Christian Clemmensen of Filmtracks also praised the work for having more world appeal than Williams' other Olympic compositions. Mark Swed of the Los Angeles Times, however, called it "junk" and "no more than an exercise in chest-thumping and whooping", preferring Michael Torke's Javelin, which was commissioned for the 1996 Cultural Olympiad.

== See also ==
- Call of the Champions
- List of compositions by John Williams
