= Soundings (Williams) =

2003 orchestral composition by John Williams

Soundings is a single-movement orchestral composition by the American composer John Williams. It was commissioned by the Los Angeles Philharmonic for the inaugural season of the Walt Disney Concert Hall. It was first performed on October 25, 2003, by the Los Angeles Philharmonic under the direction of Williams.

== Composition ==
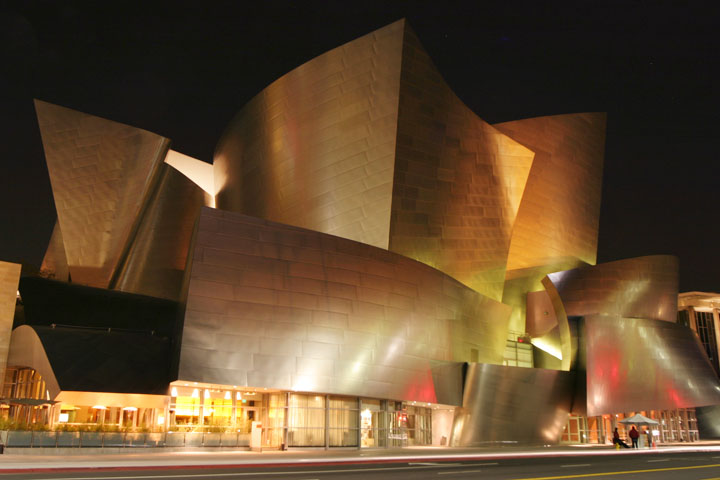
Soundings was inspired by the design of the Walt Disney Concert Hall by the architect Frank Gehry.

Soundings has a duration of roughly 15 minutes and is composed in one continuous movement divided into five sections:

1. The Hall Awakens
2. The Hall Glistens
3. The Hall Responds
4. The Hall Sings
5. The Hall Rejoices

Williams described his inspiration for the piece in the score program notes, remarking, "In writing Soundings, I've tended to think of it as an experimental piece for Walt Disney Concert Hall in which a collection of colorful sonorities could be sampled in the Los Angeles Philharmonic's new environment."

=== Instrumentation ===
The work is scored for a large orchestra consisting of four flutes (3rd and 4th doubling piccolo), three oboes (3rd doubling English horn), three clarinets (2nd doubling E-flat clarinet; 3rd doubling bass clarinet), three bassoons (3rd doubling contrabassoon), six horns, three trumpets, three trombones, tuba, timpani, percussion, harp, piano, synthesizer, celesta, and strings.

== Reception ==
Reviewing the world premiere, Mark Swed of the Los Angeles Times wrote, "If not strong on musical ideas, Soundings, which opened the program, was strong on sound. It began in silence -- a silence broken by the whirring noise of fans from the television lights (the PBS broadcast is Wednesday). Flutes and percussion then rustled to represent the hall awakening. As he is in film scores, Williams is most successful in creating a sense of expectation." He continued:

Once wide-eyed, the hall, through Williams' score, quivered, trembled, pulsated, throbbed. There were eerie and extravagant effects I couldn't quite identify. Once it sounded as if a battery of glass harmonicas surrounded the audience. Williams cleverly created the amazing illusion of instruments traveling about this listening space. A deep electronic organ note made the ground on which we sat feel alive. (The real organ will be ready next year.)

However, Zachary Woolfe of The New York Times was considerably less enthusiastic about the piece. Reviewing a 2016 performance at David Geffen Hall, Woolfe described the music as being "thoroughly outclassed" by other works on the program (which included Alberto Ginastera's Piano Concerto No. 1 and Andrew Norman's Play), adding that it was "never less and never more than professional, without a moment of the sparkling originality that permeates the work of Ginastera and Mr. Norman."

== See also ==
- List of compositions by John Williams
