= John Williams =

American composer and conductor (born 1932)

John Williams KBE
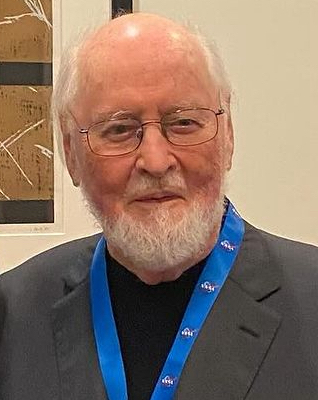
- Williams in 2024
- Born: John Towner Williams; February 8, 1932 (age 94); New York City, U.S.
- Occupations: Composer; conductor; orchestrator; arranger
- Years active: 1952–present
- Works: Compositions; discography
- Spouses: Barbara Ruick (m. 1956; died 1974); Samantha Winslow (m. 1980)
- Children: 3, including Joseph
- Father: Johnny Williams
- Relatives: Ethan and Bobby Gruska; Lionel Williams; (grandchildren); Jay Gruska (son-in-law)
- Awards: Full list

John Towner Williams (born February 8, 1932) is an American composer and conductor. Over his seven-decade career, he has composed many of the best-known scores in film history. His style blends romanticism and impressionism with complex orchestration. Best known for his collaborations with George Lucas and Steven Spielberg, he has received numerous accolades, including 27 Grammy Awards, five Academy Awards, seven BAFTA Awards, three Emmy Awards and four Golden Globe Awards. With a total of 54 Academy Award nominations, he is the second-most-nominated person in the award's history, after Walt Disney. (Note: 59 nominations, 22 awards) He is also the oldest Academy Award nominee in any category, receiving a nomination at 91 years old.

Williams's early work as a film composer includes None but the Brave (1965), Valley of the Dolls (1967), Goodbye, Mr. Chips (1969), Images (1972), The Long Goodbye (1973) and The Towering Inferno (1974). His work with Spielberg began on The Sugarland Express (1974), and he has composed music for all but five of his feature films. He received Academy Awards for Fiddler on the Roof (1971; arrangement of the original score by Jerry Bock), Jaws (1975), Star Wars (1977), E.T. the Extra-Terrestrial (1982) and Schindler's List (1993). Other memorable collaborations with Spielberg include Close Encounters of the Third Kind (1977), Raiders of the Lost Ark (1981), Jurassic Park (1993), Saving Private Ryan (1998), Catch Me If You Can (2002), Lincoln (2012) and The Fabelmans (2022). He also scored Superman (1978), the first two Home Alone films (1990–1992), and the first three Harry Potter films (2001–2004).

Williams served as the Boston Pops' principal conductor from 1980 to 1993 and is its laureate conductor. He has also composed numerous classical concertos and other works for orchestral ensembles and solo instruments. Williams's works include theme music for the 1984 Summer Olympics, "The Mission" theme (used by NBC News and Seven News in Australia) and PBS's Great Performances.

Williams received the Kennedy Center Honor in 2004, the National Medal of the Arts in 2009 and the AFI Life Achievement Award in 2016. (Note: Was the first to be awarded outside of the acting and directing fields) He was inducted into the Songwriters Hall of Fame in 1998, the Hollywood Bowl's Hall of Fame in 2000 and the American Classical Music Hall of Fame in 2004. In 2022, Williams was awarded an honorary knighthood by Queen Elizabeth II, "for services to film music". The Library of Congress included the Star Wars score in the National Recording Registry for being "culturally, historically, or aesthetically significant". The American Film Institute included three of his scores on its AFI's 100 Years of Film Scores: Jaws, E.T. and, in first place, Star Wars. His career was chronicled in the Disney+ documentary Music by John Williams (2024).

== Early life and education ==
John Towner Williams was born on February 8, 1932, in Queens, New York City, to Esther (née Towner) and Johnny Williams, a jazz drummer and percussionist who played with the Raymond Scott Quintet. He has an older sister, Joan, and two younger brothers, Jerry and Don, who play on his film scores. Williams said of his lineage: "My father was a Maine man—we were very close. My mother was from Boston. My father's parents ran a department store in Bangor, Maine, and my mother's father was a cabinetmaker." John Williams senior collaborated with Bernard Herrmann, and his son sometimes joined him in rehearsals.

In 1948, the Williams family moved to Los Angeles. John attended North Hollywood High School and graduated in 1950. He attended the University of California, Los Angeles, and studied composition privately with the Italian composer Mario Castelnuovo-Tedesco. Williams also attended Los Angeles City College for one semester to play for the school's studio jazz band.

In 1951, Williams joined the U.S. Air Force, where he played the piano and bass and conducted and arranged music for the U.S. Air Force Band. In March 1952, he was assigned to the Northeast Air Command 596th Air Force Band, and after military training at the Lackland Air Force Base in Texas, he was stationed at Davis–Monthan Air Force Base in Tucson, Arizona. While there, he attended music courses at the University of Arizona. Williams was then stationed at Pepperrell Air Force Base in St. John's, Newfoundland for two years.

In 1955, following his service, Williams moved to New York City to study piano with Rosina Lhévinne at Juilliard. Williams neither enrolled in courses nor did he graduate from the school, instead taking private lessons from Lhévinne at her practice room on campus. He originally planned on becoming a concert pianist, but after hearing John Browning and Van Cliburn perform, he switched his focus to composition, realizing "I could write better than I could play." During his studies, Williams found work in many of the city's jazz clubs as a pianist.

== Career ==
=== Early career ===
Following his studies with Lhévinne, Williams moved back to Los Angeles, where he began working as an orchestrator at film studios. During this period, Williams worked with such composers as Franz Waxman, Bernard Herrmann and Alfred Newman, and with fellow orchestrators Conrad Salinger and Bob Franklyn.

Williams was also a studio pianist and session musician, performing scores by Jerry Goldsmith, Elmer Bernstein and Henry Mancini. One of his first jobs was working under mentor Alfred Newman with an uncredited orchestral role for Carousel (1956), starring his soon-to-be wife Barbara Ruick.

With Mancini, he recorded the scores of Peter Gunn (1959), Breakfast at Tiffany's (1961), Days of Wine and Roses (1962) and Charade (1963), and played the piano part of the guitar-piano ostinato in Mancini's Peter Gunn title theme. With Elmer Bernstein, he performed on the scores for Alexander Mackendrick's Sweet Smell of Success (1957) and Robert Mulligan's To Kill a Mockingbird (1962). Williams was also the pianist on the scores of Billy Wilder's The Apartment (1960), Jerome Robbins and Robert Wise's West Side Story (1961) and Blake Edwards's The Great Race (1966).

He released several jazz albums under the name Johnny Williams, including Jazz Beginnings, World on a String and The John Towner Touch. Williams also served as music arranger and bandleader for a series of popular music albums alongside Ray Vasquez and Frankie Laine.

=== Film and television scoring ===
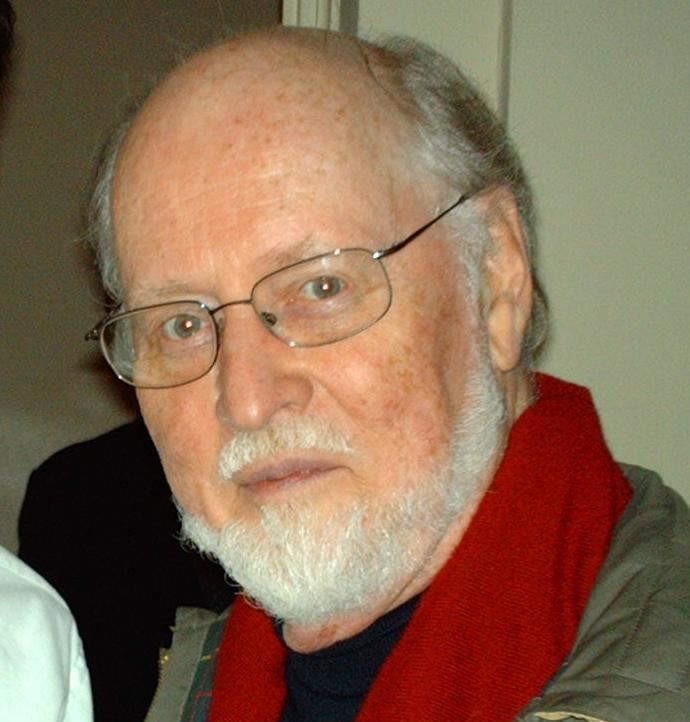
Williams at the Boston Symphony Hall after conducting the Boston Pops, May 2006

==== Rise to prominence ====
In 1952, Williams wrote his first film composition while stationed at Pepperrell Air Force Base for You Are Welcome, a promotional film created for the Province of Newfoundland tourist information office. Williams's first feature film composition was for Daddy-O (1958), followed two years later by Because They're Young. Williams also composed music for television, including Bachelor Father (1957–59), the Kraft Suspense Theatre (1963–65), Lost in Space (1965–68), The Time Tunnel (1966–67) and Land of the Giants (1968–70), the latter three created by producer Irwin Allen. He also worked on several episodes of M Squad (1957–60) and Checkmate (1960–62) and the pilot episode of Gilligan's Island (1964–67).

The American-Japanese anti-war epic None but the Brave (1965) marked the beginning of Williams's full transition from television to major Hollywood film composing, and shaped his style for future blockbusters. A Variety reviewer highlighted his score for providing "excellent background". The film was also Williams's first collaboration with Frank Sinatra, who directed and starred in it. He later conducted for Sinatra at venues such as a Sloan-Kettering Cancer Center gala.

Williams called William Wyler's How to Steal a Million (1966) "the first film I ever did for a major, super-talent director". He received his first Academy Award nomination for his score for Valley of the Dolls (1967), and was nominated again for Goodbye, Mr. Chips (1969). His first win was for Best Scoring: Adaptation and Original Song Score, for Norman Jewison's Fiddler on the Roof (1971). He scored Robert Altman's Images (1972) and The Long Goodbye (1973). Of the latter, Pauline Kael wrote, "Williams' music is a parody of the movies' frequent overuse of a theme, and a demonstration of how adaptable a theme can be." Altman, known for giving actors free rein, had a similar approach to Williams, telling him to "do whatever you want. Do something you haven't done before."

His prominence grew in the early 1970s thanks to his work for Irwin Allen's disaster films The Poseidon Adventure (1972), The Towering Inferno and Earthquake (both 1974). Williams named his Images score as a favorite; he recalls "the score used all kinds of effects for piano, percussion, and strings. It had a debt to Varèse, whose music enormously interested me. If I had never written film scores, if I had proceeded writing concert music, it might have been in this vein". As it happened, two of Williams's scores shaped the direction of his career.

==== Collaborations with Steven Spielberg ====
Williams's scores for The Reivers (1969) and The Cowboys (1972) impressed a young Steven Spielberg, who was getting ready to direct his feature debut, The Sugarland Express (1974). He requested Williams, who recalled, "I met what looked to be this seventeen-year-old kid, this very sweet boy, who knew more about film music than I did—every Max Steiner and Dimitri Tiomkin score. We had a meeting in a fancy Beverly Hills restaurant, arranged by executives. It was very cute—you had the feeling Steven had never been in a restaurant like that before. It was like having lunch with a teenage kid, but a brilliant one". They reunited a year later for Jaws. Spielberg used Williams's score for Images as a temp track while editing Jaws. When Williams played his main theme for Jaws, based on the alternation of two notes, Spielberg initially thought it was a joke. Williams explained: "the sophisticated approach you would like me to take isn't the approach you took with the film I just experienced". After hearing variations on the theme, Spielberg agreed: "sometimes the best ideas are the most simple ones". The score earned Williams his second Academy Award, his first for Best Original Score. Its ominous two-note ostinato has become a shorthand for approaching danger. The ostinato is derived from Ravel's La valse; the score also quotes Debussy's La mer and Stravinsky's The Rite of Spring.

Spielberg and Williams began a two-year collaboration on Close Encounters of the Third Kind, crafting the distinctive five-note motif that functions both in the score and in the story as the communications signal of the film's extraterrestrials. Darryn King writes: "One moment in that film captures some of Spielberg and Williams' alchemy: the musical dialogue between the humans and the otherworldly visitors, itself an artistic collaboration of sorts". Pauline Kael wrote of the scene: "the earthlings are ready with a console, and they greet the great craft with an oboe solo variation on the five-note theme; the craft answers in deep, tuba tones. The dialogue becomes blissfully garrulous ... there is a conversational duet: the music of the spheres". Williams says the surprise of the final two notes comes from the fact that the first three notes of the theme are already resolved, adding "I realized that twenty years after the fact".

Spielberg chose Williams to score 1941 (1979) and Raiders of the Lost Ark (1981). For the latter, Williams wrote "The Raiders March" for the film's hero, Indiana Jones, and separate themes for the eponymous Ark of the Covenant, Jones's love interest Marion Ravenwood and the Nazi villains. Additional themes were written and featured in his scores for Indiana Jones and the Temple of Doom (1984), Indiana Jones and the Last Crusade (1989), Indiana Jones and the Kingdom of the Crystal Skull (2008) and Indiana Jones and the Dial of Destiny (2023). Spielberg emphasized the importance of Williams's music to the Indiana Jones pictures: "Jones did not perish, but listened carefully to the Raiders score. Its sharp rhythms told him when to run. Its slicing strings told him when to duck. Its several integrated themes told adventurer Jones when to kiss the heroine or smash the enemy. All things considered, Jones listened... and lived." Williams's work on Spielberg's E.T. the Extra-Terrestrial (1982) won him a second Oscar for Best Original Score. Spielberg liked Williams's music for the climactic chase so much that he edited the film to match it.

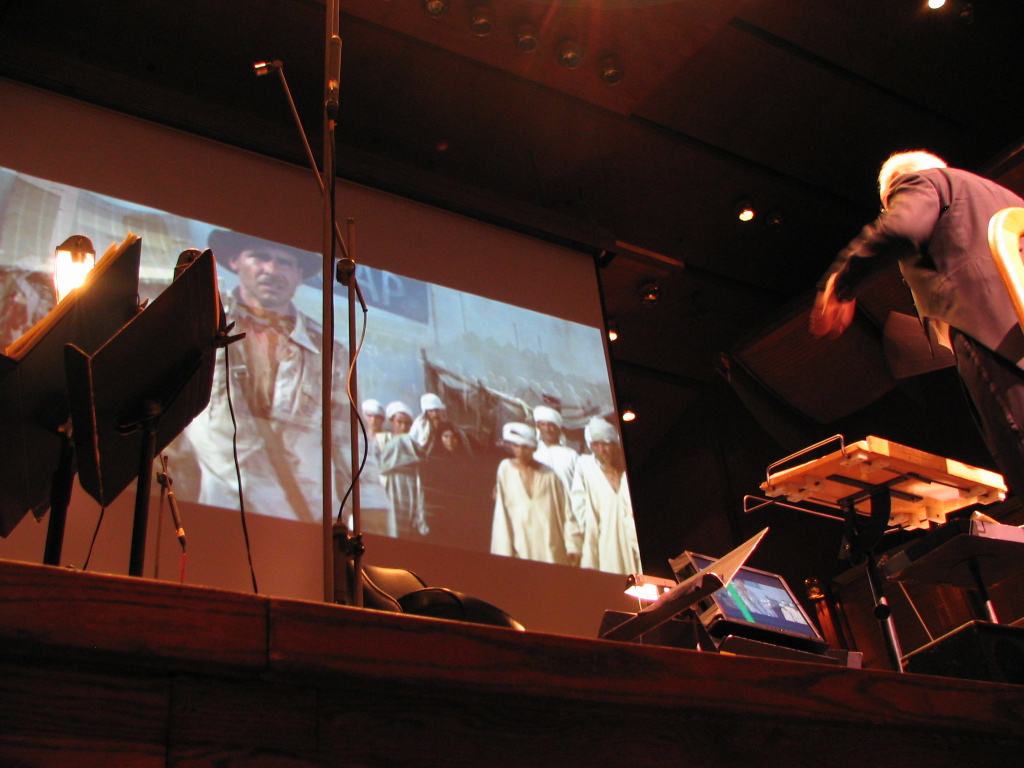
John Williams conducting the score to Raiders of the Lost Ark in the Avery Fisher Hall in 2007

After The Color Purple (1985), scored by Quincy Jones, the Spielberg-Williams collaboration resumed with Empire of the Sun (1987) and continued through Saving Private Ryan (1998). Williams also composed the theme music for, and scored several episodes of, Spielberg's anthology television series Amazing Stories (1985). Schindler's List (1993) proved to be a challenge for Williams; after viewing the rough cut with Spielberg, he was so overcome with emotion that he was hesitant to score the film. He told Spielberg, "I really think you need a better composer than I am for this film". Spielberg replied, "I know, but they're all dead". Williams asked classical violinist Itzhak Perlman to play the main theme for the film. It earned Williams his fourth Oscar for Best Original Score.

Williams composed the music for the opening logo to the DreamWorks Pictures film studio, which was co-founded by Spielberg. The logo made its debut in the studio's first release, The Peacemaker (1997). In 2001, Williams scored Spielberg's A.I. Artificial Intelligence, which was based on an unfinished project Stanley Kubrick asked Spielberg to direct. A. O. Scott argued that the movie represented new directions for director and composer, writing that Spielberg created "a mood as layered, dissonant and strange as John Williams' unusually restrained, modernist score". Per Kubrick's request, Williams included a quotation of Richard Strauss's Der Rosenkavalier in his score. Williams's jazz-inspired score for Spielberg's Catch Me If You Can (2002) alluded to works by Henry Mancini. For The Terminal (2004), Williams wrote a national anthem for the fictional nation of Krakozhia.

In 2011, after a three-year hiatus from film scoring, Williams composed the scores for Spielberg's The Adventures of Tintin and War Horse. The former was his first score for an animated film, and he employed various styles, including "1920s, 1930s European jazz" for the opening credits and "pirate music" for the maritime battles. Williams won an Annie Award for his score for Tintin. In 2012, he scored Spielberg's Lincoln, for which he received his 48th Academy Award nomination. He was also set to write the score for Bridge of Spies that year, but in March 2015, it was announced that Thomas Newman would score it instead, as Williams's schedule was interrupted by a minor health issue. Williams composed the scores for Spielberg's The BFG (2016) and The Post (2017).

In 2019, Williams served as music consultant for Spielberg's West Side Story (2021) and scored his semi-autobiographical The Fabelmans (2022). In June 2022, Williams announced that Indiana Jones and the Dial of Destiny, scheduled for a 2023 release, would likely be his last film score as he planned to retire from film and focus on solely composing concert music. However, he reversed this decision by January 2023, stating that he had at least "10 more years to go. I'll stick around for a while!". He compared the decision to Spielberg's father Arnold, who had worked in his field until he was 100. In October 2025, it was announced that he had been hired to score Disclosure Day, his thirtieth collaboration with Spielberg.

==== Star Wars and other franchises ====
Spielberg recommended Williams to his friend George Lucas, who needed a composer for his space opera Star Wars (1977). Williams delivered a grand symphonic score influenced by Antonín Dvořák, Gustav Holst's The Planets and Golden Age Hollywood composers Max Steiner and Erich Wolfgang Korngold. Williams's score is often described as Wagnerian due to its frequent use of leitmotifs. Williams downplays this influence: "People say they hear Wagner in 'Star Wars,' and I can only think, It's not because I put it there. Now, of course, I know that Wagner had a great influence on Korngold and all the early Hollywood composers. Wagner lives with us here—you can't escape it. I have been in the big river swimming with all of them." The Star Wars theme is among the most widely recognized in film history, and the "Force Theme" and "Princess Leia's Theme" are well-known examples of leitmotif. It won Williams a second Academy Award for Best Original Score. In 1980, Williams returned to score The Empire Strikes Back, introducing "The Imperial March" as the theme for Darth Vader and the Galactic Empire, "Yoda's Theme" and "Han Solo and the Princess". The original Star Wars trilogy concluded with Return of the Jedi, for which Williams provided the "Emperor's Theme", "Parade of the Ewoks" and "Luke and Leia". Both scores earned him Academy Award nominations.

In 1999, Lucas launched the first of three prequels to the original Star Wars trilogy. Williams was asked to score all three, starting with The Phantom Menace. Along with themes from the previous films, Williams created new themes for Attack of the Clones (2002) and Revenge of the Sith (2005). In 2020, Williams won the Grammy Award for "Best Instrumental Composition" for composing Star Wars: Galaxy's Edge Symphonic Suite, He received his 52nd Oscar nomination for "Best Original Score" at the 92nd Academy Awards for Star Wars: The Rise of Skywalker.

Williams scored the first three film adaptations of J. K. Rowling's Harry Potter series. The most important theme from Williams's scores for the Harry Potter films, "Hedwig's Theme", was used in each of the subsequent films. Williams was asked to return to score the film franchise's final installment, Harry Potter and the Deathly Hallows – Part 2, but director David Yates said that "their schedules simply did not align", as he would have had to provide Williams with a rough cut of the film sooner than was possible.

In early 2013, Williams expressed interest in working on the Star Wars sequel trilogy, saying: "Now we're hearing of a new set of movies coming in 2015, 2016... so I need to make sure I'm still ready to go in a few years for what I hope would be continued work with George." In 2015, Williams scored Star Wars: The Force Awakens, earning him his 50th Academy Award nomination. In 2017, he scored Star Wars: The Last Jedi, the eighth episode of the saga. Williams contributed "The Adventures of Han" and several additional demos for the 2018 standalone Star Wars film Solo: A Star Wars Story, while John Powell wrote the film's original score and adapted Williams's music.

In March 2018, Williams announced that following Star Wars: The Rise of Skywalker (2019), he would retire from the Star Wars franchise: "We know J. J. Abrams is preparing one Star Wars movie now that I will hopefully do next year for him. I look forward to it. It will round out a series of nine, that will be quite enough for me." Williams also makes a cameo in the film as Oma Tres, a Kijimi bartender. In July 2018, Williams composed the main musical theme for Disneyland and Disney's Hollywood Studios theme park attraction Star Wars: Galaxy's Edge. William Ross, who conducted the symphonic recording of the theme with the London Symphony Orchestra on Williams's behalf, additionally arranged Williams's original composition in different musical contexts for use, recording nearly an hour of musical material at Abbey Road Studios in November 2018. Williams won the Grammy Award for Best Instrumental Composition for his Star Wars: Galaxy's Edge Symphonic Suite. In 2022, he contributed the theme music for the Star Wars miniseries Obi-Wan Kenobi, which was subsequently adapted further by William Ross.

==== Other film and television work ====
Williams scored Alfred Hitchcock's final film, Family Plot (1976). Hitchcock told Williams to remember one thing: "Murder can be fun." Williams took inspiration from Hitchcock's frequent composer Bernard Herrmann, and Hitchcock was pleased with the result. Williams followed a similar approach when scoring Brian de Palma's The Fury (1978). Kael called Williams "a major collaborator" on the film, writing that he had "composed what may be as apt and delicately varied a score as any horror movie has ever had. He scares us without banshee melodramatics. He sets the mood under the opening titles: otherworldly, seductively frightening. The music cues us in".

Williams scored Richard Donner's Superman (1978). Donner reportedly interrupted the demo premiere of the opening title by running onto the soundstage, exclaiming, "The music actually says 'Superman'!" King writes that "Donner had a theory that the three-note motif in the main theme—the one that makes you want to punch the air in triumph—is a musical evocation of 'SU-per-MAN!'". When asked if there was anything to that, Williams replied "There's everything to that." The score's heroic and romantic themes, particularly the main march, the Superman fanfare and the love theme, "Can You Read My Mind?", appeared in the subsequent Salkind/Cannon film sequels. The main march returned as part of John Murphy and David Fleming's score to James Gunn's Superman (2025), the first film of the DC Universe.

In 1985, NBC commissioned Williams to compose a television news music package for various network news spots. The package, which Williams named "The Mission", consists of four movements, two of which are still used heavily by NBC today for Today, NBC Nightly News and Meet the Press. In his Oscar-nominated score for Lawrence Kasdan's The Accidental Tourist (1988), Williams developed the two main theme sections in different ways, turning the mood lighter or darker through orchestration and an unexpected use of synthesizers.

Williams scored The Book Thief (2013), his first collaboration with a director other than Spielberg since 2005. The score earned him an Academy Award, Golden Globe and BAFTA nominations and a Grammy Award for Best Instrumental Composition. It was his 44th nomination for Best Original Score (and 49th overall), setting a new record for the most nominations in that category (he tied Alfred Newman's record of 43 nominations in 2013). In 2017, Williams scored the animated short film Dear Basketball, directed by Glen Keane and based on a poem by Kobe Bryant. In 2023, he was commissioned by ESPN to write an original composition, "Of Grit and Glory", for the 2023 College Football Playoff National Championship.

=== Classical works and conducting ===
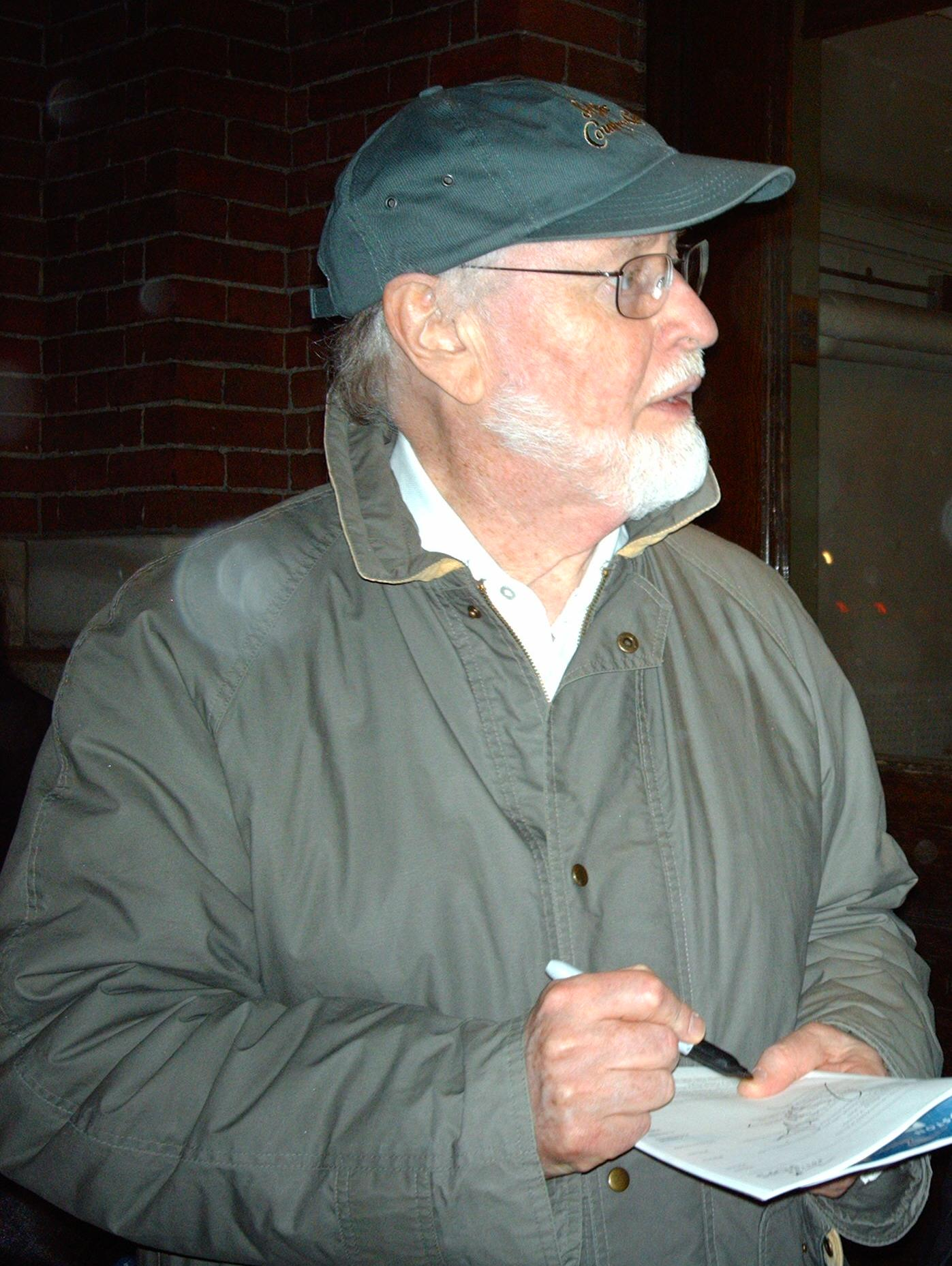
Williams signing an autograph after a concert in 2006

==== Boston Pops ====
From 1980 to 1993, Williams served as the Boston Pops' principal conductor, succeeding Arthur Fiedler. Williams never met Fiedler in person but spoke to him by telephone. His arrival as the Pops' new leader in the spring of 1980 allowed him to devote part of the Pops' first PBS broadcast of the season to presenting his new compositions for The Empire Strikes Back. Williams almost ended his tenure with the Pops in 1984 when some players hissed while sight-reading a new Williams composition in rehearsal; Williams abruptly left the session and tendered his resignation. He initially cited mounting conflicts with his film composing schedule but later admitted a perceived lack of discipline in, and respect from, the Pops' ranks, culminating in this latest instance. After entreaties by the management and personal apologies from the musicians, Williams withdrew his resignation and continued as principal conductor for nine more years. In 1995, he was succeeded by Keith Lockhart, the former associate conductor of the Cincinnati Symphony Orchestra and Cincinnati Pops Orchestra. Williams is now the Pops' laureate conductor, thus maintaining his affiliation with its parent Boston Symphony Orchestra. Williams leads the Pops on several occasions each year, particularly during their Holiday Pops season and typically for a week of concerts in May. He conducts an annual Film Night at both Boston Symphony Hall and Tanglewood, where he frequently enlists the Tanglewood Festival Chorus.

==== Compositions ====
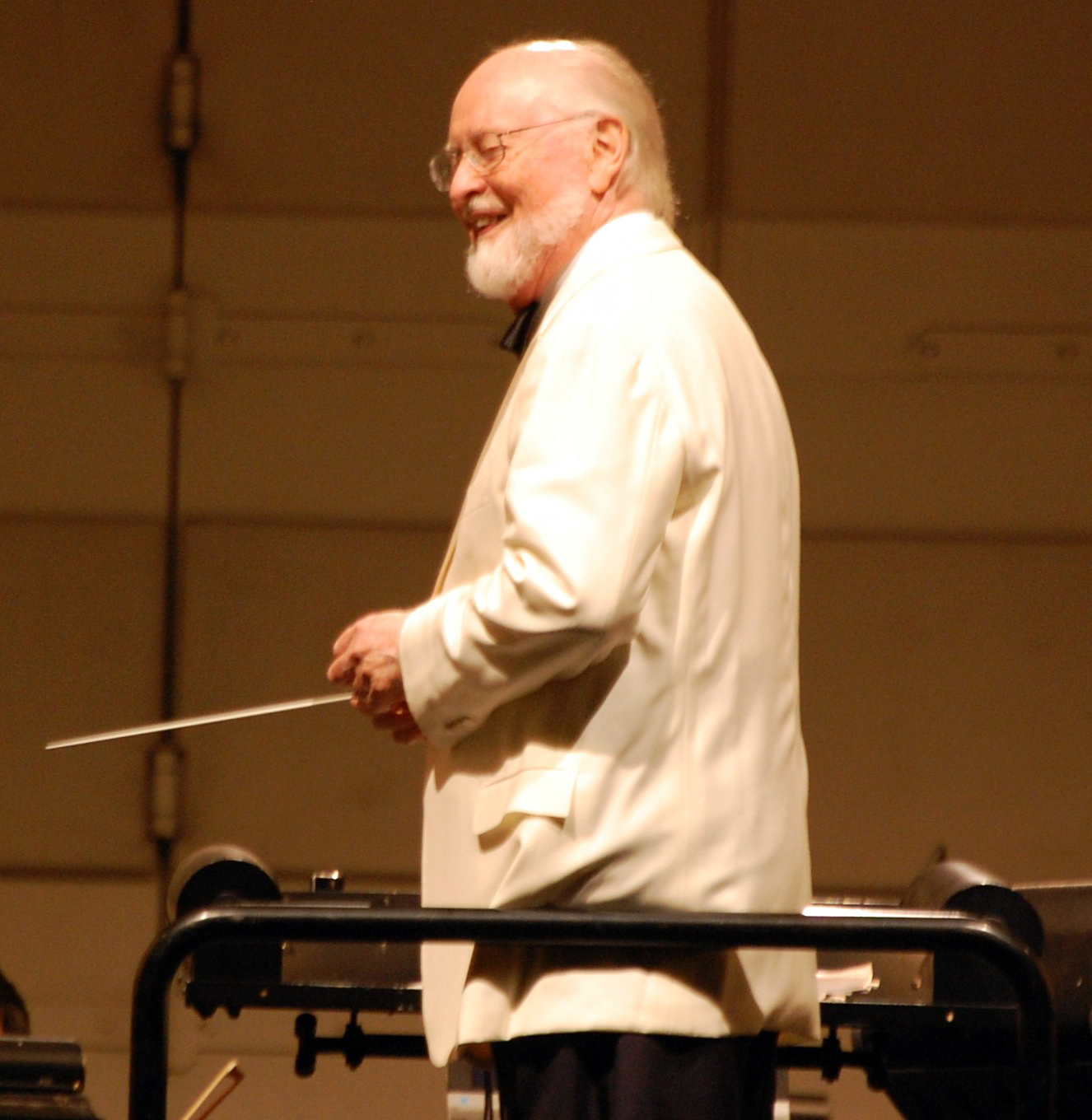
Williams conducting at Hollywood Bowl in 2009

Williams has written many concert pieces, including a symphony; a sinfonietta for wind ensemble; a concerto for horn written for Dale Clevenger, the Chicago Symphony Orchestra's principal horn; a concerto for clarinet written for Michele Zukovsky, the Los Angeles Philharmonic's principal clarinetist, in 1991; a cello concerto premiered by Yo-Yo Ma and the Boston Symphony Orchestra at Tanglewood in 1994; concertos for the flute and violin recorded by the London Symphony Orchestra; and a trumpet concerto, which was premiered by The Cleveland Orchestra and their principal trumpet Michael Sachs in September 1996. His bassoon concerto, The Five Sacred Trees, which was premiered by the New York Philharmonic and principal bassoon player Judith LeClair in 1995, was recorded for Sony Classical by Williams with LeClair and the London Symphony Orchestra. His "Violin Concerto No. 2" was written for and premiered by Anne-Sophie Mutter and the Boston Symphony Orchestra at Tanglewood in 2021, with Williams conducting.

Williams composed the Liberty Fanfare for the Statue of Liberty's rededication; "We're Lookin' Good!" for the Special Olympics in celebration of the 1987 International Summer Games; and themes for the 1984, 1988, 1996 and 2002 Olympic Games. One of his concert works, Seven for Luck, for soprano and orchestra, is a seven-piece song cycle based on the texts of former U.S. poet laureate Rita Dove. It had its world premiere by the Boston Symphony under Williams with soprano Cynthia Haymon.

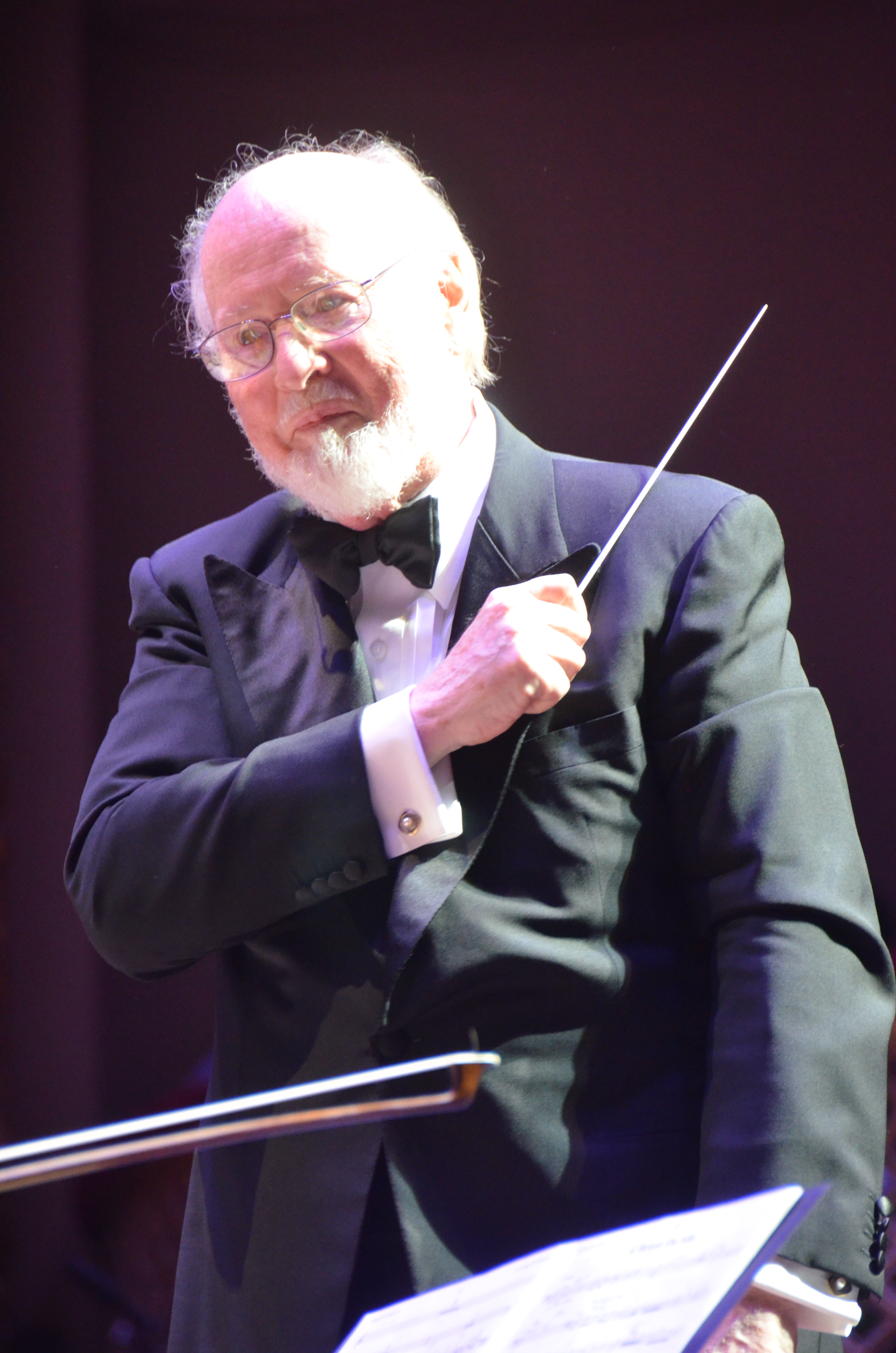
Williams in 2011, conducting the Boston Pops Orchestra

Williams makes annual appearances with the Los Angeles Philharmonic at the Hollywood Bowl, and took part as conductor and composer in the orchestra's opening gala concerts for the Walt Disney Concert Hall in 2003, which included the premiere of his piece Soundings. In 2004, he served as the grand marshal for the Rose Parade and conducted "The Star Spangled Banner" at the Rose Bowl Game. In April 2005, Williams and the Boston Pops performed the "Throne Room Finale" from Star Wars at opening day in Fenway Park as the Boston Red Sox, having won their first World Series championship since 1918, received their championship rings. For Game 1 of the 2007 World Series, Williams conducted a brass-and-drum ensemble in a new dissonant arrangement of "The Star Spangled Banner". He composed the quartet Air and Simple Gifts for the first inauguration of Barack Obama. The piece is based on the hymn "Simple Gifts", made famous by Aaron Copland in Appalachian Spring. Williams chose the theme because he knew Obama admired Copland. It was performed by Yo-Yo Ma, violinist Itzhak Perlman, pianist Gabriela Montero and clarinetist Anthony McGill.

Williams has guest conducted "The President's Own" United States Marine Band on several occasions, who commissioned him in 2013 to write "Fanfare for The President's Own" (his first concert band work since his sinfonietta for wind ensemble) in honor of their 215th anniversary. In 2023, Williams was made an honorary U.S. Marine at the conclusion of his fifth concert with the Marine Band at the Kennedy Center in Washington DC.

In 2021, Williams conducted the world premiere of "Overture to the Oscars" at Tanglewood's 2021 "Film Night". This was followed in 2022 by a "Fanfare for Solo Trumpet", written for the reopening of David Geffen Hall, and "Centennial Overture", written in celebration of the 100th Anniversary of the Hollywood Bowl. He composed a piano concerto for Emanuel Ax which premiered at Tanglewood in July 2025.

==== Conductor ====
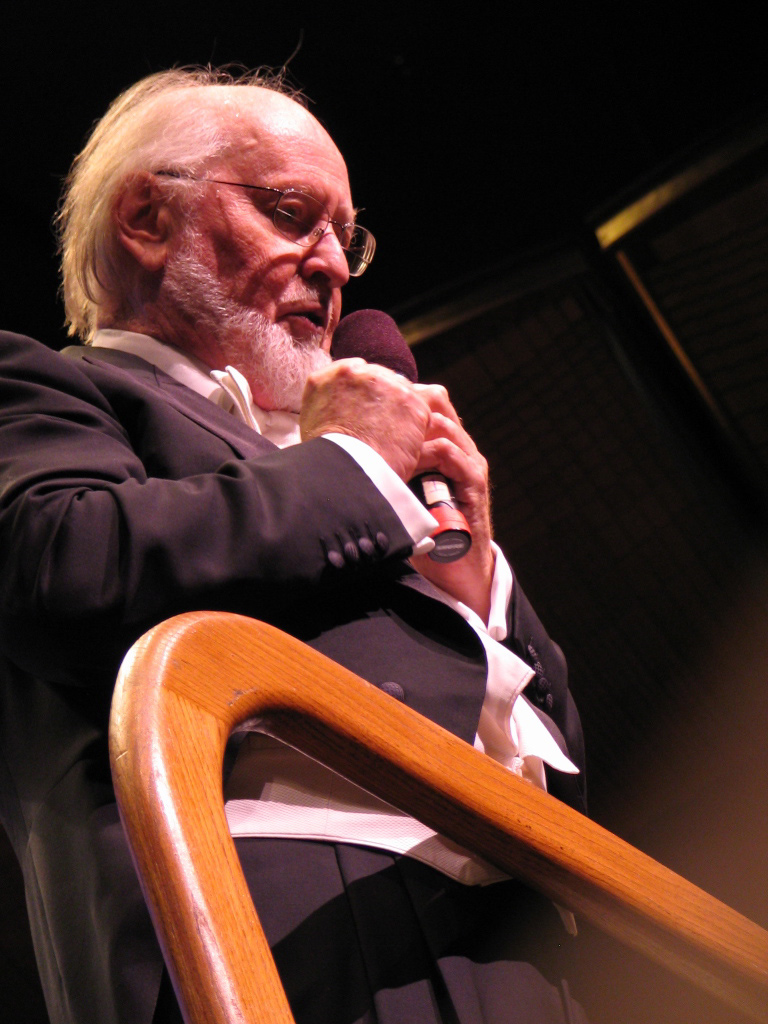
Williams at Avery Fisher Hall in 2004

In February 2004, April 2006 and September 2007, Williams conducted the New York Philharmonic at Avery Fisher Hall in New York City. The initial program was intended to be a one-time special event, and featured Williams's medley of Oscar-winning film scores first performed at the previous year's Academy Awards. Its unprecedented popularity led to two concerts in 2006, fundraising gala events featuring personal recollections by Martin Scorsese and Steven Spielberg. Continued demand fueled three more concerts in 2007, which all sold out. These featured a tribute to the musicals of Stanley Donen and served as the New York Philharmonic season's opening event. After a three-season absence, Williams conducted the philharmonic once again in October 2011.

After over a ten-year break, Williams returned to New York in 2022 to conduct the Philadelphia Orchestra for a benefit concert at Carnegie Hall, with special guest violinist Anne-Sophie Mutter. The next year, he was feted at a gala at David Geffen Hall by Spielberg, celebrating their nearly fifty-year collaboration. In 2024, he returned to headline another gala at Carnegie Hall with the Philadelphia Orchestra, this time with Yo-Yo Ma as his special guest.

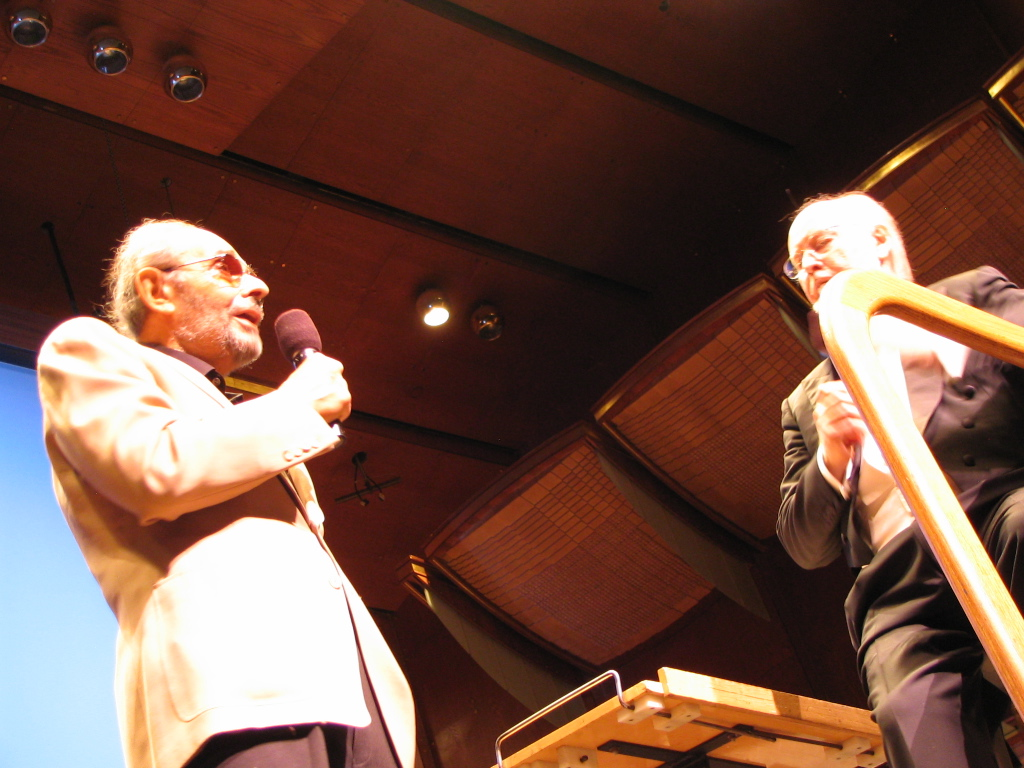
Stanley Donen (left) and Williams at Avery Fisher Hall in 2007

Williams also conducted the National Symphony Orchestra, the U.S. Army Herald Trumpets, the Joint Armed Forces Chorus, and the Choral Arts Society of Washington in his new arrangement of "The Star-Spangled Banner" for the anthem's 200th anniversary. The performance was held at A Capitol Fourth, an Independence Day celebration concert in Washington, D.C., on July 4, 2014. On April 13, 2017, at Star Wars Celebration Orlando, Williams performed a surprise concert with the Orlando Philharmonic Orchestra featuring "Princess Leia's Theme" (a tribute to the recently deceased Carrie Fisher).

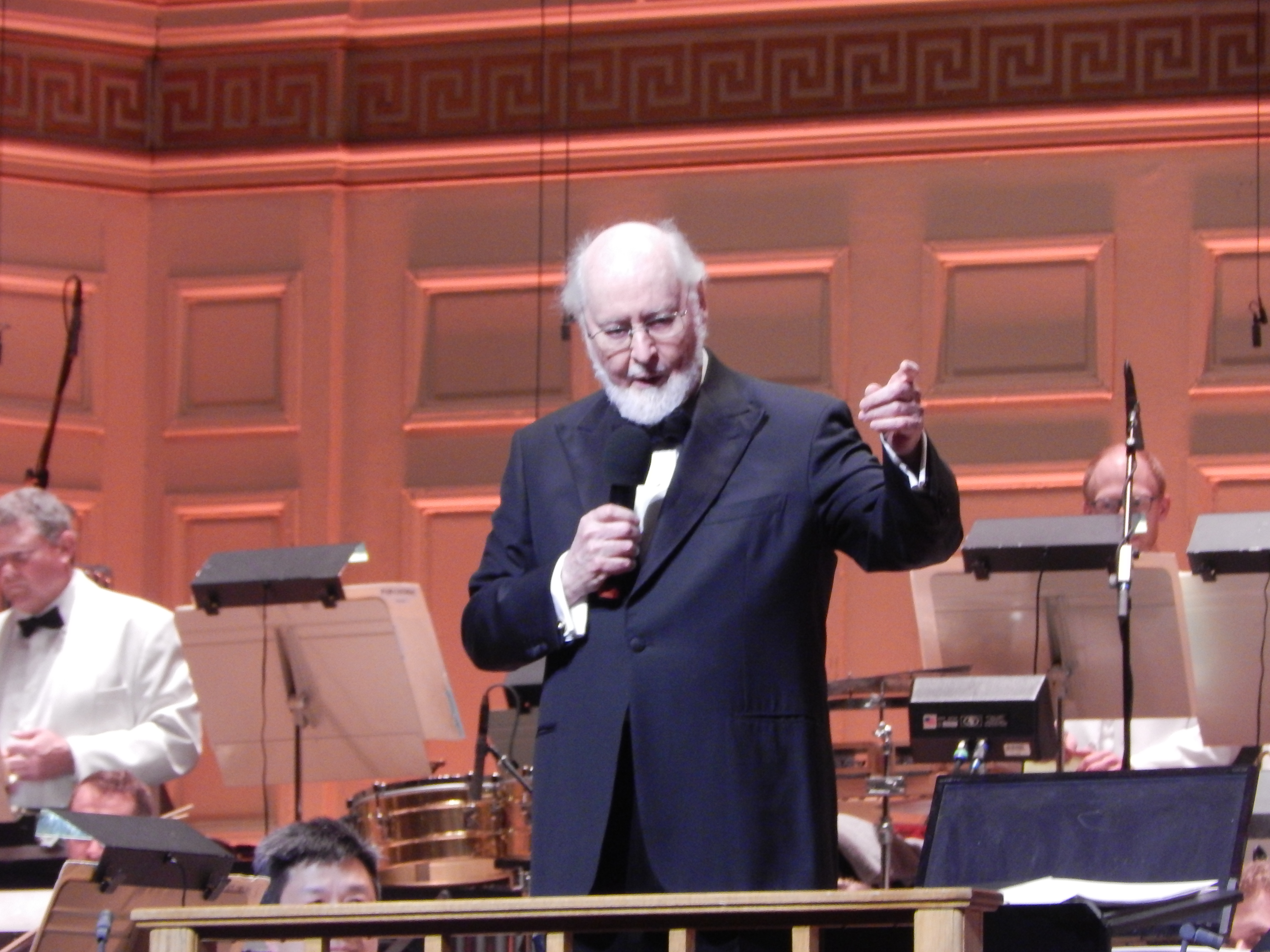
John Williams conducting the Boston Pops in May 2018

Anne-Sophie Mutter, introduced to Williams by their mutual friend André Previn, collaborated with Williams on an album, Across the Stars, on which Mutter played themes and pieces from Williams's film scores in his new arrangements for violin. It was released in August 2019. The Vienna Philharmonic Orchestra invited Williams to lead concerts in January 2020, his first engagement with a European orchestra, for an all-Williams concert featuring Mutter as soloist. The concert included many pieces from Across the Stars. The resulting recording, John Williams in Vienna, became the bestselling orchestral album of 2020, reaching the top 10 in many countries and topping the U.S. and UK classical charts. The orchestra also commissioned a new procedural from Williams for their annual Philharmonikerball.

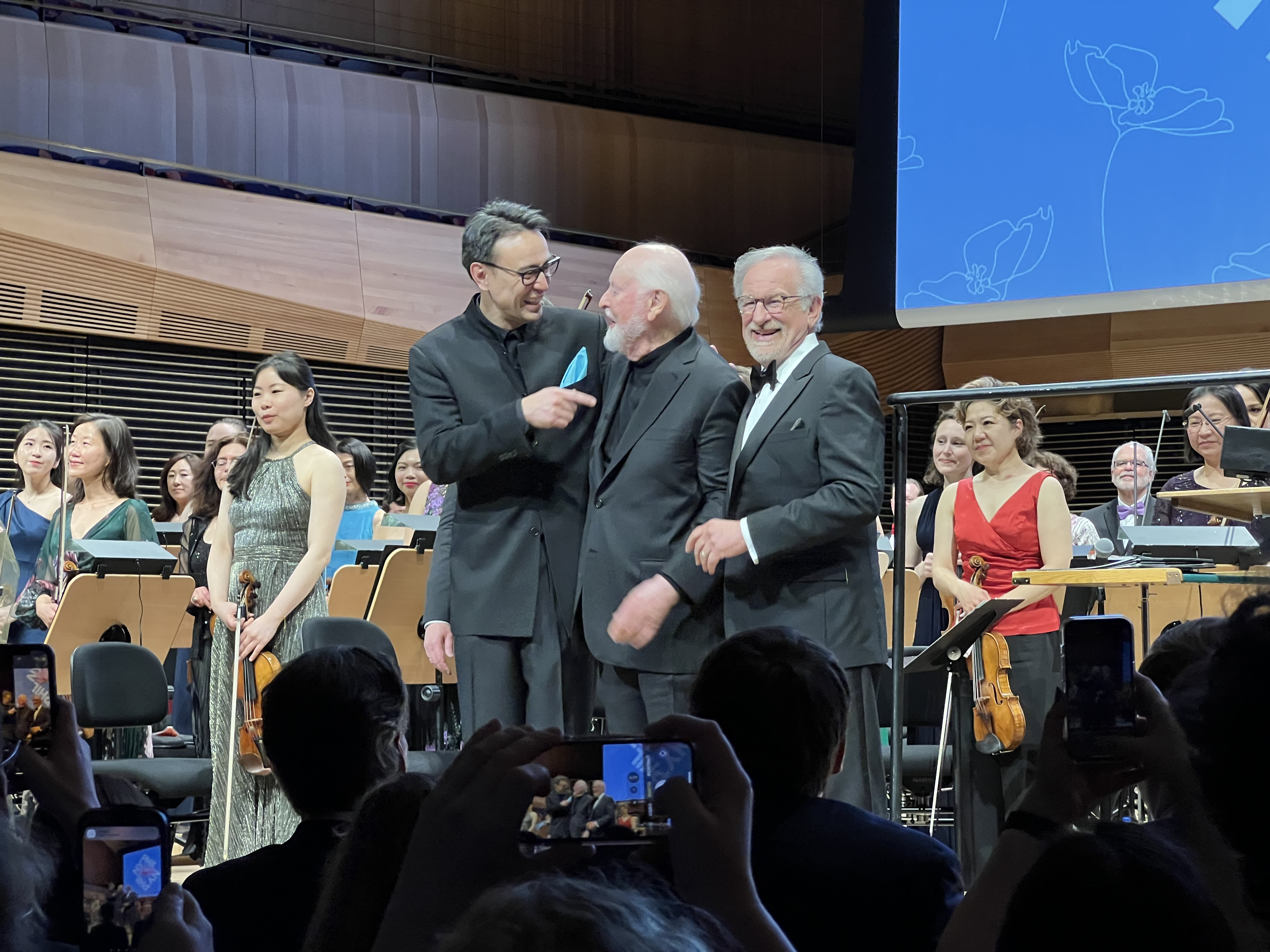
Ken-David Masur (left), Williams, and Spielberg at David Geffen Hall in 2023

Williams conducted the Berlin Philharmonic from October 14–16, 2021, marking his second engagement with a European orchestra and his first with the Berlin Philharmonic. In 2022, in celebration of his 90th birthday, Williams conducted the Vienna Philharmonic in March, and was honored on August 20 with a tribute at Tanglewood. The tribute at Tanglewood featured James Taylor, Yo-Yo Ma, and Branford Marsalis. The Boston Symphony Orchestra performed some of Williams's best-known music, with Williams conducting the "Raiders March" from the Indiana Jones movies at the end of the show. Williams made a surprise appearance at the U.S. premiere of the Indiana Jones and the Dial of Destiny (2023) on June 15, where he conducted themes with a live symphony orchestra. Also present were Spielberg, Lucas, Harrison Ford and James Mangold. Later that year, he conducted the Saito Kinen Orchestra in Matsumoto and Tokyo, Japan.

== Personal life ==
In 1956, Williams married Barbara Ruick, an American actress and singer, and they remained married until her death in 1974. The couple had three children: Jennifer "Jenny" Williams Gruska (b. 1956), Mark Towner Williams (b. 1958), and Joseph Williams (b. 1960); the last is best known as the lead singer of Toto. Through his daughter Jennifer, his grandchildren are Bobby Gruska and Ethan Gruska, who are the members of the duo band The Belle Brigade.

In 1980, Williams married Samantha Winslow, a photographer.

== Awards, recognition and legacy ==
Norwegian composer Marcus Paus argues that Williams's "satisfying way of embodying dissonance and avant-garde techniques within a larger tonal framework" makes him "one of the great composers of any century". Similarly, his film music has clear influences from other classical and film composers, including Holst, Stravinsky, Korngold and others. The Boston Globe named Williams as "the most successful composer of film music in the history of the medium".

Williams has been nominated for 54 Academy Awards, winning five; six Emmy Awards, winning three; 25 Golden Globe Awards, winning four; 77 Grammy Awards, winning 27; and has received seven British Academy Film Awards. With 54 Oscar nominations, Williams currently holds the record for the most Oscar nominations for a living person and is the second most nominated person in Academy Awards history behind Walt Disney's 59. Williams is the only person to be nominated for an Academy Award in seven consecutive decades (the 1960s, 70s, 80s, 90s, 2000s, 2010s, and 2020s). He is also the oldest person, at age 91, ever to be nominated for an Academy Award. Forty-eight of Williams's Oscar nominations are for Best Original Score and five are for Best Original Song. He won four Oscars for Best Original Score (for Jaws, Star Wars, E.T. and Schindler's List) and one for Best Adaptation and Original Song Score (for Fiddler on the Roof).

Williams was the subject of an hour-long documentary for the BBC in 1980, and was featured in a report on 20/20 in 1983. He has received several academic honors, including an Honorary Doctorate of Music from Berklee College of Music in 1980, as well as Honorary Doctor of Music degrees from Boston College in 1993, from Harvard University in 2017, and from the University of Pennsylvania in 2021. Williams was made an honorary brother of Kappa Kappa Psi at Boston University in 1993, upon his impending retirement from the Boston Pops. Since 1988, Williams has been honored with 15 Sammy Film Music Awards, the longest-running awards for film music recordings. In 2000, Williams received the Golden Plate Award of the American Academy of Achievement.

Williams was inducted into the Songwriters Hall of Fame in 1998. He has also been inducted into the American Classical Music Hall of Fame and the Hollywood Bowl Hall of Fame. Williams was honored with the annual Richard Kirk award at the 1999 BMI Film and TV Awards, recognizing his contribution to film and television music. In 2004, he received a Kennedy Center Honor. He won a Classic Brit Award in 2005 for his soundtrack work of the previous year.

In 2003, the International Olympic Committee accorded Williams its highest individual honor, the Olympic Order. In 2009, Williams received the National Medal of Arts in the White House in Washington, D.C., for his achievements in symphonic music for films, and "as a pre-eminent composer and conductor [whose] scores have defined and inspired modern movie-going for decades". In 2012, Williams received the Brit Award for Outstanding Contribution to Music. In 2013, Williams was presented with the Ken Burns Lifetime Achievement Award. In 2016, Williams was made a Chevalier De L'Ordre des Arts et des Lettres from the Government of France. In 2018, the performing rights organization Broadcast Music, Inc. established The John Williams Award, of which Williams became the first recipient. That same year, Williams received the Grammy Trustees Award, a Special Merit Award presented to individuals who have made significant contributions to the field of recording. He received a President's Medal award from the Juilliard School and announced during the ceremony that he intended to bequeath his entire library of scores and his sketchbooks, to the college.

In 2020, Williams received the Gold Medal of the Royal Philharmonic Society and the Princess of Asturias Award for the Arts (jointly with Ennio Morricone). In 2022, Williams was awarded an honorary knighthood (KBE) by Queen Elizabeth II, "for services to film music", one of the final two honorary knighthoods awarded during the Queen's seventy-year reign. In 2024, Williams was inducted into the American Academy of Arts and Letters (jointly with Terence Blanchard) and received the Disney Legends award at the Honda Center. His career was chronicled in the documentary Music by John Williams.

On April 29, 2026, the John Williams Performing Arts Center was named in his honor at North Hollywood High School, his alma mater.

== Concert works ==
=== Concertos ===
- 1969: Concerto for Flute and Orchestra
- 1974: Violin Concerto No. 1
- 1985: Concerto for Tuba and Orchestra
- 1991: Concerto for Clarinet and Orchestra
- 1993: Concerto for Bassoon and Orchestra, The Five Sacred Trees
- 1994: Concerto for Cello and Orchestra
- 1996: Concerto for Trumpet and Orchestra
- 1997: Elegy for Cello and Orchestra
- 2000: TreeSong for Violin and Orchestra
- 2002: Heartwood: Lyric Sketches for Cello and Orchestra
- 2002: Escapades for Alto Saxophone and Orchestra (adapted from the Catch Me If You Can film score)
- 2003: Concerto for Horn and Orchestra
- 2009: Concerto for Viola and Orchestra
- 2009: On Willows and Birches, for Harp and Orchestra
- 2011: Concerto for Oboe and Orchestra
- 2014: Prelude and Scherzo for Piano and Orchestra
- 2017: Markings for Violin, Strings and Harp
- 2018: Highwood's Ghost, An Encounter for Cello, Harp and Orchestra
- 2021: Violin Concerto No. 2
- 2025: Concerto for Piano and Orchestra

=== Other orchestral works ===
- 1965: Prelude and Fugue (recorded on Stan Kenton Conducts the Los Angeles Neophonic Orchestra (Capitol, 1965))
- 1965: Symphony no. 1
- 1965: Essay for Strings
- 1968: Sinfonietta for Wind Ensemble
- 1975: Thomas and the King – Musical
- 1980: Jubilee 350 Fanfare
- 1984: Olympic Fanfare & Theme
- 1986: Liberty Fanfare
- 1987: A Hymn to New England
- 1988: Fanfare for Michael Dukakis
- 1988: For New York
- 1990: Celebrate Discovery
- 1993: Sound the Bells!
- 1994: Song for World Peace
- 1995: Variations on Happy Birthday
- 1999: American Journey
- 2003: Soundings
- 2007: Star Spangled Banner
- 2008: A Timeless Call
- 2012: Fanfare for Fenway
- 2012: Seven for Luck for soprano and orchestra
- 2013: For 'The President's Own'
- 2014: Star Spangled Banner
- 2021: Overture to the Oscars
- 2022: Centennial Overture
- 2023: Of Grit and Glory

=== Chamber works ===
- 1951: Sonata for Piano
- 1997: Elegy for Cello and Piano
- 2001: Three Pieces for Solo Cello
- 2007: Duo Concertante for Violin and Viola
- 2009: Air and Simple Gifts for violin, cello, clarinet and piano
- 2011: Quartet La Jolla for violin, cello, clarinet and harp
- 2012: Rounds for solo guitar
- 2013: Conversations for solo piano
- 2014: Music for Brass for Brass Ensemble and Percussion

== Discography ==
=== Charting hit singles (U.S., Billboard) ===
Year	Title	Billboard Hot 100	Billboard AC
1975	Main Title (Theme from "Jaws")	32	22
1977	Star Wars (Main Title)	10	4
1978	Theme from "Close Encounters of the Third Kind"	13	13

== See also ==
- List of compositions by John Williams
- Music by John Williams, a documentary film about him
- Music of Star Wars
- Music of Superman
- Music of Harry Potter

== Notes ==
Cultural offices
Preceded by Arthur Fiedler	Principal conductor, Boston Pops; 1980–1993	Succeeded by Keith Lockhart
