= List of Sydney to the Max episodes =

Sydney to the Max is an American comedy television series created by Mark Reisman that aired on Disney Channel from January 25, 2019 to November 26, 2021. The series stars Ruth Righi, Ava Kolker, Jackson Dollinger, Christian J. Simon, Ian Reed Kesler, and Caroline Rhea.

== Series overview ==
Season	Episodes	Originally released	
Season	Episodes	First released	Last released
1	21	January 25, 2019	July 23, 2019
2	21	December 13, 2019	August 21, 2020
3	21	March 19, 2021	November 26, 2021

== Episodes ==
=== Season 1 (2019) ===
No. overall	No. in season	Title	Directed by	Written by	Original release date	Prod. code	U.S. viewers (millions)
1	1	"Can't Dye This"	David Kendall	Mark Reisman	January 25, 2019	101	0.71
Upon entering seventh grade, Sydney wants a radical new hairstyle to stand out from other girls at school. Sydney's paternal grandmother approves of the hairstyle, but Syd's father Max thinks she is too young for such a hairdo, so he declines to take her to a hairstylist. Sydney defies her father and, with help from her friend Olive, tries to implement her new hairstyle without a stylist, but she accidentally turns her hair multiple colors. Max changes his mind and decides to take Sydney to a hairstylist to get her desired hairdo, and Syd keeps her failed hairdo a secret from him by wearing a wig. At the salon, Sydney's deceit is revealed when the wig comes off, and Max takes her back home before she can get a new hairdo. Meanwhile, flashback scenes set in 1992 show young Max wanting to bleach his hair so he can fit in better with a group of skateboarders called the Dog Boys. However, his mother disapproves. Max goes against her and applies hair bleach with help from his friend Leo, but it turns his hair red instead. In the present, Max's mother tells this story to Sydney, who accuses Max of being a hypocrite. Max apologizes and takes her back to the salon, where she gets a simple new hairdo. But she was punished even when he told her no. Guest star: Frances Callier as Gia
2	2	"Who Let the Dogs In?"	David Kendall	Gary Murphy	February 1, 2019	106	0.69
Sydney wants to adopt a dog named Rocco, but Max does not believe she is responsible enough for a pet. Sydney goes against him and secretly takes in Rocco, who she hides in her bedroom, hoping to prove after a week that she can be responsible for a pet. However, she turns out to be allergic to Rocco. Still unaware of the dog, Max hires a cleaning team, Don and Kyle, to clean Syd's room and stop her allergies. Meanwhile, in 1992, young Max wants a dog but his mother Judy gets him a turtle first, so he can demonstrate responsibility. Max quickly grows attached to the turtle and names him Hawk, but the turtle escapes one day after Max accidentally leaves the front door open. In the present, one of the cleaners smashes a hole in Sydney's bedroom wall, checking for mold. Judy helps to keep Rocco a secret, but Sydney later confesses to Max. Syd learns Max did not want her to have a pet because he was afraid that she would suffer heartbreak the way he did when he lost Hawk. To their surprise, Hawk emerges from the hole in the wall, having survived all these years. Syd is delighted to have Hawk as a pet, and Rocco is adopted by the cleaning team. Guest stars: Eric Petersen as Don, Jeffrey Brown as Kyle
3	3	"The Parent Track"	David Kendall	Patrice Asuncion & Nick Rossitto	February 8, 2019	104	0.59
Sydney and Olive want to attend a rock concert on their own, but Max believes Syd is too young to go without an adult. Instead, she spends time at Olive's house. Meanwhile, in 1992, young Max is excited to receive a beeper, but is dismayed when he realizes Judy only got it for him to track his whereabouts. Max defies Judy by seeing a PG-13 film with Leo at a theater, but they are annoyed when Judy keeps beeping Max. She eventually realizes Max has been lying, and this childhood behavior prompts present-day Max to reluctantly track Sydney through her cellphone. Upon realizing this, Sydney decides she and Olive will attend the concert while leaving her phone at Olive's house, to trick Max into thinking she never left. However, Syd feels guilty, and during the concert, she learns her phone was accidentally taken by Iggy, a pizza deliveryman who stopped at Olive's house earlier. The girls retreat, and Max catches up to Iggy and realizes Syd apparently never left the house. At home, Max and Sydney admit what they did and forgive each other. However, Sydney must attend the concert the following night with Max, who embarrasses her during the show. Guest stars: Gabriel Tigerman as Adult Gerald, Reid Shapiro as Iggy, Buddy Handleson as Gerald
4	4	"Adventures in Babe-Sitting"	Robbie Countryman	Denise Moss	February 22, 2019	107	0.48
Sydney and Olive start a babysitting service to earn money. While watching a boy named Dylan at his house, the girls learn he is the younger brother of Zach, a popular eighth-grader. Zach invites his friends to the house, despite his mother telling the girls that no visitors were allowed. Sydney and Olive ignore Dylan to spend time with Zach and his friends, but when Dylan threatens to call his mother, the girls decide to send Zach's friends away. Sydney and Olive spend their remaining time with Dylan and convince him that they are fun babysitters, which later leads to increased business for their service. Meanwhile, young Max convinces Judy he no longer needs a babysitter while she goes out. At home that night, Max and Leo watch a scary film, and Leo returns to his house after being frightened by the movie. Max is also afraid after watching the film, and is scared to be alone. Later, he tells Judy he would be fine with having a babysitter again. Guest stars: Luca Alexander as Zach, Lauren Plaxco as Ms. Taylor, Miles Emmons as Dylan, Madelyne Alorro as Whitney, Max Jimenez as Hudson, Saylor Bell as Mia
5	5	"Shaved by the Bell"	David Kendall	Mark Reisman	March 1, 2019	102	0.68
Sydney and Olive are invited to a pool party, but Sydney is concerned that the children there will notice her new leg hair. Unsure of how to shave her legs, Sydney wants advice from Judy, but she is busy attending a music festival. To teach Sydney, Max shaves his own legs to learn how it is done, but he winds up giving himself numerous shaving injuries. Judy returns when the festival ends early, due to rain. Judy helps Sydney realize that she should shave her legs because she wants to, and not because of what other people might think. Sydney decides not to shave them until she feels ready to do so. Max fills in as a chaperone for the party, where the children are so busy mocking his shaving injuries, they fail to notice Syd's leg hair. Meanwhile, young Max wants facial hair to look mature like his fellow skateboarders, and Leo tells him that hair grows in faster and thicker once shaving has started. Max wants to learn how to shave from his father, a pilot who lives in another city and has an unpredictable work schedule. Judy thinks Max is too young to shave, but ultimately decides to teach him how to do it. Guest star: Matthew Zhang as Sixteen Year Old Boy
6	6	"I Know What You Did Last Sleepover"	Danielle Fishel	Eric Zimmerman & Kirill Baru	March 8, 2019	105	0.52
Olive stays with the Reynolds while her parents are out of town for a week, although she and Sydney become secretly annoyed by each other. Not wanting to hurt each other's feelings, they both secretly enlist Max to stop the other girl's annoying habits, such as Olive talking late into the night and Sydney playing a bass guitar while Olive is studying. Eventually, they reveal their feelings and have a fight, but they later reconcile. Elsewhere, Judy has fun playing against zombies in an augmented reality game. Meanwhile, young Max has been busy spending time with the Dog Boys. As a result, he has been repeatedly late to work at the arcade, prompting Leo to fire him. Max is upset over Leo's decision, but the two later reconcile.
7	7	"Good Grade Hunting"	Robbie Countryman	Maegan McConnell & Heather Wood	March 15, 2019	108	0.58
Sydney is upset that her poetry teacher, Mrs. Harris, keeps giving her low grades, making her question her dream of becoming a songwriter. Sydney is surprised to learn that Harris was also Max's poetry teacher in seventh grade and had given him an "A". Harris tells Sydney that her poems do not express who she truly is, although Sydney believes that Harris actually hates her, so she has Max invite Harris to their house as a chance to impress her. Although Sydney and Harris bond over their love of music, Sydney's next grade is lower than last time, prompting her to write a new poem expressing her upset feelings about Harris. To Sydney's surprise, Harris gives her an "A", stating that the poem truly expresses her feelings. Elsewhere, Judy starts taking college classes, as she had previously only finished a semester before giving birth to Max. Judy feels she does not fit in at college, so she decides to quit, but she later makes a friend and chooses to continue attending classes. Meanwhile, young Max impresses Leo with his poetry and decides to participate in a poetry slam. Although the audience does not applaud his work, Max believes it is only because he is ahead of his time. Guest star: Melissa Peterman as Mrs. Harris
8	8	"You've Got Female"	David Kendall	Denise Moss	March 22, 2019	103	0.52
Sydney auditions for the after-school jazz club, but is dismayed to learn she was not accepted because she is a girl. Sydney and Olive learn that other girls have also been rejected from school clubs, so they organize a school protest. As a result, new auditions are held for each club. Sydney loses her potential spot in the jazz club to another girl, who thanks Sydney for giving her the courage to audition. Elsewhere, Grandma Judy joins a dodgeball team, but is later kicked off for being too aggressive. Meanwhile, young Max befriends a skater girl named Brittany, who is upset that the Dog Boys will not let her skate at a park because she is a girl. Max pretends to not know who the Dog Boys are, but they and Brittany arrive at the arcade while he is working. While Max tries to make the Dog Boys leave, he has Leo distract Brittany. However, she realizes Max and the Dog Boys know each other, and Max loses her as a friend. Guest stars: Rizwan Manji as Vice Principal Virmani, Siena Agudong as Brittany, Wyatt Walter as Riccoli, Keyon Bowman as Miles, Mac Jarman as Griffin
9	9	"The Lyin' King"	Wendy Faraone	Eric Zimmerman & Kirill Baru	March 29, 2019	109	0.45
Sydney and Olive become friends with a girl named Robyn. However, Robyn accidentally spoils the ending of a television show for Olive, who decides to stop being friends with her. At Olive's request, Sydney agrees to stop spending time with Robyn, although Syd secretly still hangs out with her. Later, Olive befriends Robyn again, but wants to keep the friendship a secret for now because she had already made a big deal to Sydney about not being friends with her. Robyn decides to stop hanging out with the girls due to their secretive behavior. Meanwhile, Leo has decided to play school basketball, but is disappointed to be placed on the C team. Young Max does not want to play basketball, but he tries out at the request of Coach Willis, who is impressed enough to place Max on the A team. Max keeps his basketball involvement a secret from Leo, who is upset to learn about it when the A and C teams play against each other. The C team wins the game, and Leo is added to the A team with Max. Leo credits Max for making him angry enough to play well and win the game. Guest stars: Symera Jackson as Robyn, Ransford Doherty as Coach Willis
10	10	"Caved & Confused"	Jon Rosenbaum	Nick Rossitto & Patrice Asuncion	April 5, 2019	110	0.57
Sydney decides that she wants a new place to hang out with her friends, away from Max. With help from Don, she turns the Reynolds family basement into a new hang-out area. Max is upset that Sydney would rather spend time with her friends in the basement than watch new episodes of a television cooking show, which they have watched together for years. Grandma Judy helps Max realize that Sydney needs more time for her friends as she gets older. Max invites Don and Iggy to watch the cooking show with him, but they are not interested in it. Feeling bad for not spending time with Max, Sydney decides to watch the show with him. Meanwhile, young Max and Leo hold robot battles with their friends in Max's basement, but they also try to keep it a secret from Judy by performing laundry duties for her in the basement, where the washer and dryer machines are located. Eventually, Max's friends leave him as they become tired of handling the laundry. Judy later reveals that she knew about the robot battles and that she used Max to do laundry as punishment for keeping the battles a secret from her. Guest stars: Eric Petersen as Don, Reid Shapiro as Iggy, Brogan Hall as Bucky, Julia Garcia as Emmy
11	11	"Can't Hardly Date"	Jon Rosenbaum	Gary Murphy	April 12, 2019	111	0.62
Sydney encourages Max to start dating again, as it has been five years since her mother died. Max meets a woman named Maggie who is browsing his bicycle store, Reynolds Rides. They go on a date, but Max secretly dislikes Maggie's frequent use of baby talk when she is speaking to him. Later, Sydney and Maggie realize they share the same interests, prompting Max to continue dating her despite the baby talk. Maggie begins using baby talk toward Sydney, who keeps her dislike of it a secret from Max, not wanting to ruin his new relationship. Max and Sydney eventually learn of each other's true feelings, and Max decides to end the relationship with Maggie, although he plans to continue dating. Meanwhile, young Max and Leo begin selling bagged popcorn for their school in exchange for items from a prize catalog, including a new skateboard for Max. Sales are poor until the boys start selling the popcorn along with cheat codes for the games in the arcade. Because of an issue with Judy's car, Max must deliver the sold popcorn bags by transporting them on a wagon hauled by his bike. Max realizes how much he enjoys bike-riding, and the experience later leads to him opening the bike store. Guest star: Kelly Frye as Maggie
12	12	"Little Shop of Reynolds"	Jon Rosenbaum	Eric Zimmerman & Kirill Baru	April 19, 2019	112	0.60
Max becomes sick with a flu prior to holding a big sale at Reynolds Rides. Sydney, Olive, and Grandma Judy take over operations at the bike store to avoid cancelling the sale, but Judy becomes sick too, leaving only the girls and bike assembler Hunter. They become overwhelmed by a multitude of customers, but Sydney convinces the clientele to give her another chance, and the sale is ultimately a success. Meanwhile in 1992, Leo's father hires a girl, Haley, to work at the arcade with Max and Leo. The boys develop a crush on Haley and both try to impress her, but they eventually decide they are not ready for a relationship. Guest stars: Andy Ridings as Hunter, Isabella Kai Rice as Haley, Iris Braydon as Sylvia, S. Zylan Brooks as Maureen, Jacory Gums as Trent, Liesel Kopp as Athena
13	13	"Dude, Where's My Car Wash Money?"	Danielle Fishel	Patrice Asuncion & Nick Rossitto	April 26, 2019	113	0.49
Olive becomes school council treasurer, but she loses $500 from a car wash fundraiser that was to pay for an ice cream truck. Olive learns her belt bag containing the money was accidentally switched with a customer's bag at Reynolds Rides. As the customer has left on a cross country bike trip, Olive has no way to retrieve the money. Elsewhere, Grandma Judy and her friends start using miniature vehicles to get around their college campus. The Reynolds decide to rent the vehicles to people to race around on a miniature track set up inside Reynolds Rides, which earns back the money that Olive lost, allowing her to remain as treasurer. Meanwhile in 1992, Judy plans to attend a co-worker's wedding, but her date cancels due to an injury. Young Max decides to accompany Judy to the wedding so she has someone to dance with, although he hopes she will buy him a video game in return. Leo is unsuccessful at teaching Max how to dance, so Max decides to have Leo accompany Judy to the wedding instead, realizing that the video game is not that important. However, Judy only wants to go with Max, despite his poor dancing. She also decides to get him the video game. Guest stars: Reid Shapiro as Iggy, Nicolas Cantu as Dominic, Tiffany Daniels as Sharon
14	14	"As Bad as She Gets"	Danielle Fishel	Denise Moss	June 18, 2019	114	0.54
For Max's birthday, Sydney has Leo and his son Leo "LJ" Jr. come to Portland for a visit. Leo now owns a technology company in San Francisco, but decides to move back to Portland after having a good time with Max and after seeing LJ bond with Sydney. LJ does not want to move, but he and Sydney cannot bring themselves to break apart their fathers, who are enjoying their reunion. To convince Leo that the move is a bad idea, Sydney and LJ steal bicycles from Max's bike store, hoping to appear as bad influences on each other. However, their plan causes Max and Leo to argue about their own friendship after they wonder which of their children got the idea to steal the bikes. Leo decides to call off the move. Meanwhile, in 1992, young Leo is upset that his parents are sending him to a private school. Young Max and Leo make a videotaped pact to always remain friends even if they are apart. Ultimately, the school burns down before Leo can attend it. In the present, Sydney and LJ get their fathers to reconcile after showing them the tape they made in 1992. Guest stars: Winston A. Marshall as Grown Up Leo, Judith Moreland as Ms. Watkins, Joachim Powell as LJ
15	15	"There's Something About Zach"	David Kendall	Gary Murphy	June 25, 2019	115	0.49
Sydney and Olive are working on a science fair project with their friends Emmy and Sophia. When Zach is hired to make smoothies at Reynolds Rides, Sydney and Olive begin neglecting their project to spend time with him instead. After Sydney and Olive help Zach with his new job and with school work, Zach invites the girls to be his dates to a party. They accept his invitation but later leave the party to work on their half of the school project, after realizing how hard Emmy and Sophia worked on their own half. Emmy and Sophia learn that Sydney and Olive have been neglecting the project, but soon forgive them and help finish it. Meanwhile, young Max is tired of doing chores for Judy and would rather play video games with Leo. Tomas, the Spanish-speaking owner of a restaurant next to the arcade, becomes attracted to Judy. Leo, who speaks Spanish, sets them up on a date at Max's request. Judy and Tomas begin a relationship, giving Max more free time while they go out on dates. However, Max is upset when Tomas proposes marriage to Judy. She and Tomas then reveal that they are pranking Max, as she is aware of Max's scheme to keep her out of the house. Guest stars: Luca Alexander as Zach, Lauren Plaxco as Ms. Taylor, Julia Garcia as Emmy, Amelia Wray as Sophia, Carlos Acuña as Tomas
16	16	"Nuthin' but a Dance Thang"	Jody Margolin Hahn	Denise Moss	July 2, 2019	116	0.43
Max is excited to attend an upcoming father-daughter dance with Sydney, and she is hesitant to tell him that she has outgrown the event. She ultimately tells Max the truth, and he accepts it. However, Sydney changes her mind and decides to attend the dance with Max after talking to Grandma Judy. Meanwhile, young Max is upset when his father cannot make it to an upcoming father-son sports event at school, although he hides his disappointment from Judy. Max hires a man, Chet, to pretend to be his father in the event, although Judy discovers his plan. Max tells her that he is tired of being the only child at school events without a father, so Judy fills in for the sports event. Guest stars: Julia Garcia as Emmy, Amelia Wray as Sophia, Scott Connors as Chet, Connor Tillman as Handler
17	17	"Never Been Pierced"	Jody Margolin Hahn	Maegan McConnell & Heather Wood	July 9, 2019	117	0.47
Sydney and Olive want to get their ears pierced, but Olive is afraid that it will hurt, so Sydney decides to wait until Olive is ready before getting her own ears pierced. Sydney agrees to help Mrs. Harris put together a rocker look for an upcoming air guitar competition. When they go shopping at an earring and accessory store, Sydney decides to proceed with the ear-piercing. Later, Sydney learns that Judy had been waiting years for the day when she could take Sydney to get her ears pierced. Sydney tries to keep her pierced ears a secret from Judy, who eventually finds out. Although Judy is upset at Sydney, she realizes she should blame herself for not telling Syd how important this was to her. Meanwhile, in 1992, Mrs. Harris has Max write an essay about The Great Gatsby. Judy reads Max's paper before he turns it in, and she decides to secretly rewrite it to prevent him from getting a poor grade. However, he gets a "C−", prompting Judy to talk to Harris about her grading. Harris believes the paper lacked Max's imagination and creativity, and Judy accidentally admits that she wrote it. Max is allowed to turn in his real paper, and he gets a "B+". Guest stars: Melissa Peterman as Mrs. Harris, Amelia Wray as Sophia, Kara Crane as Abby
18	18	"Nightmare on Syd Street"	Ian Reed Kesler	Kirill Baru & Eric Zimmerman	July 16, 2019	118	0.48
When Sydney gives a school presentation, she accidentally puts up a video clip of her kissing a stuffed animal. Embarrassed, she decides she will not return to school the next day. Meanwhile, Judy is viewing old home movies of Max and is uploading them to a cloud. Sydney helps her out, but falls asleep and dreams that she and Olive are in 1992 with young Max and Leo. Sydney accidentally ruins Max's skateboarding stunt, embarrassing him in front of other students. Max refuses to go back to school and decides to run away. Eventually, he decides to instead try performing his stunt again, but he fails once more. Although the students mock him, he quickly gets over it and realizes it is no big deal. When Sydney awakens, she too gets over her embarrassment and decides to return to school. Guest stars: Aaron Takahashi as Mr. Tanaka, Brekkan Spens as Chad
19	19	"Mo' Grandmas, Mo' Problems"	Danielle Fishel	Nick Rossitto & Patrice Asuncion	July 16, 2019	119	0.52
Sydney's maternal grandmother, a federal judge named Maya, visits the Reynolds family. Judy feels left out when Sydney and Maya have fun without her. Overhearing this, Sydney decides to ask both her grandmothers to be guest speakers in her class. Judy declines, but eventually agrees after Sydney keeps asking her. At school, the students are interested to hear Maya speak, but they are less excited to hear Judy talk about her former job at the DMV. Later, Sydney agrees to spend her spring break with Maya in Washington, D.C., but she subsequently remembers that she and Judy had already made other plans to go glamping during her break. Eventually, the family agrees to spend spring break together in Washington, D.C. Meanwhile, in 1992, Judy gets a second job as a cosmetics saleswoman so she can earn money to pay for the house's pipes to be repaired. However, she slips on Max's skateboard and injures herself. Judy had already invited a group of mothers to her house to try to sell them her products. Max and Leo fill in for Judy and manage to sell all of her cosmetics to the women, who purchase the products in exchange for gossip about their children. Guest stars: Carlease Burke as Grandma Maya, Julia Garcia as Emmy, Aaron Takahashi as Mr. Tanaka, Erin Pineda as Mrs. Chavez, Christine Horn as Mrs. Wallingford
20	20	"Dancin' the Vida Loca"	David Kendall	Gary Murphy	July 23, 2019	120	0.49
When Sydney discovers an old box addressed to her by her mother, she finds that it contains items from her mother's time as a ballet dancer. Sydney decides to try out for ballet to be like her mother, but she is upset when she is placed in the eight-year-old age group due to her inexperience. Sydney's teacher, Miss Celeste, agrees to let her advance to an older age group if she can improve her ballet dancing. Later, Sydney injures her ankle, but she works through the pain and impresses Celeste enough to advance. However, Sydney decides that she does not like ballet, and Max tells her that she is already like her mother through her determination to succeed. Meanwhile, young Max and Leo secretly film each other as they pull pranks on one another. They plan to send one of their videos to a television program which showcases prank videos, hoping to win a cash prize. However, they cannot agree on which video to send in. Guest stars: Sundra Oakley as Miss Celeste, Emily Churchill as Gretchen, Juliet Donenfeld as Morgan
21	21	"How Sydney Got Her Phone Back"	Robbie Countryman	Story by : Denise Moss; Teleplay by : Eric Zimmerman & Kirill Baru and Patrice Asuncion & Nick Rossitto	July 23, 2019	121	0.51
Sydney and her friends are upset when the school plans to enact a new ban on the usage of cellphones, which is meant to keep students from getting distracted. Sydney convinces Max, who is on the Parent School Committee, to oppose the ban during an upcoming vote. However, when the committee meets, Max is persuaded to vote in favor of the ban. Later, Sydney and her friends help their parents realize that they too are distracted by their cellphones. The children convince their parents that such a ban cannot teach them self-control. Meanwhile, in 1992, vice principal Virmani takes Max's skateboard because of a school policy that prohibits them. Max and Leo sneak into Virmani's office to retrieve the skateboard, but must hide when Virmani walks in. Judy then speaks with Virmani and gets the skateboard back, and after they leave the office, Max and Leo retreat. Judy later reveals her awareness that Max snuck into the office, and he is forbidden from using his skateboard for a month. Guest stars: Rizwan Manji as Vice Principal Virmani, Amelia Wray as Sophia, Aaron Takahashi as Mr. Tanaka, Ginifer King as Angela

=== Season 2 (2019–20) ===
No. overall	No. in season	Title	Directed by	Written by	Original release date	Prod. code	U.S. viewers (millions)
22	1	"How the Syd Stole Christmas"	Robbie Countryman	Nick Rossitto & Patrice Asuncion	December 13, 2019	201	0.40
Each year after the death of Sydney's mother, the family has gone on vacation for Christmas. This year, their trip to Hawaii is canceled because of an active volcano, and Sydney is hesitant to celebrate Christmas at home without her mother. Sydney and Olive volunteer for a charity to bring Christmas presents to a needy family, the Millers. Sydney eventually learns that her mother, Dr. Alisha Reynolds, delivered each of Mrs. Miller's babies. Sydney remembers an earlier Christmas in which Alisha had to leave to deliver a baby, who turned out to be Mrs. Miller's. Sydney also recalls that her mother made her promise to have fun on Christmas with or without her, and Sydney decides to keep her old promise. Meanwhile, in 1992, young Max unwraps his Christmas gift early and is happy to find that Judy has gotten him a new jacket. Max wears the jacket to school to impress the students, and he intends to wrap it back up for Christmas before Judy finds out, but the jacket later goes missing. Pete, another student, had taken the jacket but he eventually decides to return it. When Max learns that Pete comes from a poor family, he decides to let Pete keep the jacket. Guest stars: Krystal Joy Brown as Alisha, Reid Shapiro as Iggy, Cheryl Texiera as Mrs. Miller, Arjun Sriram as Pete
23	2	"Father of the Bribe"	Robbie Countryman	Mark Reisman	March 23, 2020	202	0.44
Sydney tries out for the girls' fencing team and gets in. However, after learning that Max had given the fencing coach a special discount on a bike, Sydney is worried that her father bribed her way into the team. She believes that her opponent, Hannah deserved the spot more. So, Sydney and Hannah convince Coach Carlock to let them rematch. When the coach returns the bike without a receipt, Max respects Syd's wish and refuses to do him any more favors. This upsets the coach and makes Sydney worried he might fail her. Despite the coach being tough on her, Sydney wins the rematch. Coach Carlock then reveals that both Sydney and Hannah made the team since someone else quit. Back in the past, after learning that Judy's boss is looking for a videographer for her son's birthday, Max and Leo pretend to be the videographers recommended by Judy. Guest stars: Eric Allan Kramer as Coach Carlock, Lisa Ann Walter as Marlene, Griffin Kunitz as Adam, Dana Heath as Hannah
24	3	"Sister Pact"	Jon Rosenbaum	Emily Hirshey	March 24, 2020	205	0.42
Sydney, Olive, Sophia and Emmy are excited for their first middle school dance. Tired of the date drama about who would ask who to the dance, the Four Amigas make a pact to go as a group. However, Syd breaks the pact by agreeing to go to the dance with her crush, Ned. This causes Emmy and Sophia to accept dates too, leaving Olive as the only one without a date. Sydney cancels her date to stay home with Olive, but when Olive gets a date, Sydney ends up being the one without one. Since Max is chaperoning, he convinces Sydney to not let a boy hold her back from going to the dance. At the dance, the girls realize that they're much happier together than with the boys. Back in 1992, Max asks a soccer girl named Lauren to the dance. On the day of the dance, he feels intimidated after seeing how pretty Lauren is in formal wear. So, he stands her up. In the present, Max runs into adult Lauren at the dance and apologizes for standing her up. Guest stars: Julia Garcia as Emmy, Amelia Wray as Sophia, Paul-Mikél Williams as Ned, Violet Lux as Lauren, Whitney Rice as Adult Lauren
25	4	"Night Not at the Museum"	Robbie Countryman	Gary Murphy	March 25, 2020	203	0.42
After Sydney misses one too many curfews, Max gets fed up and grounds her, but this means she cannot go to the Pop-Up Cake Museum which is for one night only, and all her friends will be going to it. Sydney tries constantly to get Max to change his mind, but to no avail, with thanks to being persuaded by Angela. As a last resort, she considers sneaking out, but after reading Max's voicemails of him worrying that she's out late, she decides to accept her punishment and promises to come home earlier. Meanwhile in 1992, Max gets grounded by Judy and tries to get out of his punishments, only to make them worse. Guest stars: Lisa Ann Walter as Marlene, Ginifer King as Angela, Amelia Wray as Sophia
26	5	"Going the Green Mile"	Jon Rosenbaum	Denise Moss	March 26, 2020	204	0.42
After learning about plastic waste, Sydney, Olive, Emmy and Sophia decide to stand up against plastic use. When the new principal refuses to listen to them, they lead a protest against plastic use in school. Feeling that they haven't done enough, Sydney says they need to do more in order to make a difference. She urges her friends to change their lives and become more earth-friendly. On Emmy's birthday, Sydney convinces them to work on a garden. She makes her hungry friends pass up burgers, but when she goes to throw them away, she gets tempted and takes a couple bites. Her friends confront her for being selfish and ruining Emmy's birthday. She wants to give up trying to save the earth but Max convinces her that she doesn't have to change the world overnight. Back in 1992, Young Max and Leo protest to keep unhealthy sugary snacks in the school vending machines. Guest stars: Reginald Veljohnson as Principal Linkenberry, Julia Garcia as Emmy, Amelia Wray as Sophia, Emily Happe as Ms. Pringle
27	6	"Girls II Women"	Jody Margolin Hahn	Cailan Rose	March 27, 2020	206	0.45
Sydney gets her first period. Olive gives her a pad and Judy teaches her how to put it on. When she gets an accident at school, she reaches out to Olive, Sophia and Emmy who shield her so that no one sees the blood in her jeans. To avoid such an embarrassment again, Syd wants to sit out her bass solo at the school concert. Sophia visits her and reveals that she has been getting her period too but was too embarrassed to tell anyone. This encourages Syd to embrace her womanhood instead of being controlled by the fear of getting embarrassed. When Sophia accidentally drops her pad before the concert, Sydney and her friends protect her by claiming it's theirs. Sydney then boldly reveals to the audience that she got her period. To her surprise, she is not embarrassed at all. Back in the past, when young Max accidentally drops his underwear in school, a bully finds it and starts blackmailing him. Guest stars: Julia Garcia as Emmy, Amelia Wray as Sophia, Delila Ali Rajah as Mrs. Richardson, West Mulholland as Jimmy Mason, Thalia Tran as Suzi Harrison
28	7	"Baby One More Rhyme"	Jody Margolin Hahn	Patrice Asuncion & Nick Rossito	April 3, 2020	210	0.37
Sydney is excited when she is chosen as one of the five finalists to become a songwriting partner to Ricky Angelo, and is asked to compose an original song about her life. However, when presenting the song to Ricky's manager Drexel, he starts making drastic changes to it, such as changing the song's meaning and turning it into a bouncy pop ballad, which Sydney is against. At the contest, Sydney tries to perform the changed song, but with encouragement from Ricky, she sings it the way she wrote it, since it comes from the heart. But Ricky chooses another girl to be his partner because Sydney's song cannot be sung by him or anyone else but Sydney herself. Sydney is then inspired to be a singer and songwriter herself. Guest stars: Brogan Hall as Bucky, Reid Shapiro as Iggy, Nic Luken as Ricky Angelo, Paul Fox as Drexel, Madison Shamoun as Kim, Grifon Aldren as Dario
29	8	"Mrs. Harris' Opus"	Raven-Symoné	Nick Rossitto & Patrice Asuncion	April 10, 2020	215	0.37
Mrs. Harris takes her poetry class to the Modern Art Museum. Sydney wants to write her poem about "The Jamzy Experience" art installation. She and Olive convince Mrs. Harris to let them go see it on their own. While taking photos of the installation, Olive's belt gets entangled with the rope and accidentally destroys the exhibit. Vice Principal Virmani gives them detention and wants to fire Mrs. Harris for her involvement. Syd and Olive try to save Mrs. Harris by saying they snuck into the exhibit without her permission, but Mrs. Harris tells him the truth. To save Mrs. Harris, Sydney and Max reach out to past students - including Pete, the artist behind the Jamzy Experience - whose lives were changed by Mrs. Harris. They convince Virmani to let Mrs. Harris keep her job. Meanwhile, back in 1992, Harris takes students to the art museum but the experience is ruined when some of the students take it as a joke. Guest stars: Melissa Peterman as Mrs. Harris, Rizwan Manji as Vice Principal Virmani, Arjun Sriram as Pete, Nick Jaine as Adult Pete, Maggie Carney as Museum Docent
30	9	"The Lunch Club"	Kelly Park	Cailan Rose	June 1, 2020	214	0.39
After Sydney joined the fencing team, the girls have been hanging out a lot and Sydney feels left out. Sydney doesn't want to tell her friends about it at first, but they are really supportive of it. Sydney hangs out with the fencing team at lunch and is given a nickname, but then feels left out because it looks like her friend group is having so much fun together. She alternates between the fencing team and her friend group and finally decides she has to choose between them. She is torn apart. She doesn't want to leave her friend group and tries to decide if she wants to leave the fencing team. Her friend group doesn't want her to abandon something she is so passionate about. Sydney finally decides to leave the fencing team, and everyone is okay with it in the end. Guest stars: Julia Garcia as Emmy, Amelia Wray as Sophia, Alison Fernandez as Chloe, Surela Basu as Dylan, Tony Espinosa as Jordan
31	10	"Boy Meets Dad"	Jody Margolin Hahn	Denise Moss	June 2, 2020	211	0.26
Max is chosen for the Heart of Portland Award because his business gives back to the community. After reading about it, Max's father, Doug comes to town for Max's big day. Max is worried that his father will disappoint him again like he always does. Syd convinces Max to give Grandpa Doug another chance to prove that he has changed. However, early on the day of Max's award, Sydney is disappointed when she catches her grandfather sneaking out. To avoid breaking Max's heart, Judy and Syd lie to him that Doug is still coming to the awards. To their surprise, Doug actually shows up during Max's speech and apologizes for bailing on him. In 1992, Max's father fails to show up for Max's first skateboard tournament, but buys his way out by getting Max a new skateboard. He then promises to take Max to Seven Flags the next day but he bails again. Judy steps in to go with Max. Guest stars: Tom Wilson as Grandpa Doug, Arianna Ortiz as Mayor Ramirez
32	11	"Slurping with the Enemy"	Kelly Park	Eric Zimmerman & Kirill Baru	June 3, 2020	213	0.32
Max is worried about losing his customers to the new smoothie shop, Best Blendz Forever. Syd sympathizes with him but after tasting their signature flamingo smoothie, she finds it irresistible. Sydney joins Olive, Sophia and Emmy to get the smoothie behind her father's back. Unfortunately, Best Blendz Forever film her for a commercial without her knowledge. Sydney and Judy try to distract Max from seeing the commercial but a customer shows it to him. Max is so disappointed in Sydney for betraying him. Judy gets Max to taste the smoothie which helps him realize why Sydney couldn't resist it. In order to win customers back, Max and Sydney decide to come up with a new signature smoothie, with the help of Sydney's friends as tasters. In 1992, Leo's father, Henry asks Leo and Max to spy on a new laser tag place called Laser Palace to see if it's a real competition. After finding how good it is, Leo doesn't want to break his father's heart. However, it turns out that Henry wasn't worried about competition; he wanted to buy the place. Guest stars: Julia Garcia as Emmy, Amelia Wray as Sophia, James Black as Henry, Kevin Grady as Parker, Keyara Milliner as Ruby
33	12	"What's My Grade Again?"	Caroline Rhea	Emily Hirshey	June 4, 2020	217	0.42
Sydney, Olive and Sophia are excited for eighth grade but Emmy reveals that she might be held back in seventh grade for failing her history class. To save their friend, Sydney, Olive and Sophia help Emmy find most of her missing homework assignments. She turns them in but Mr. Tanaka says that she still has to get a B in the final. Emmy's friends try to help her study but she is easily distracted. Max tells Sydney that Emmy might be going through something else. Eventually, Emmy opens up to her friends that she has an attention disorder learning disability. This helps her friends come up with more effective ways to help her study. With her friends' encouragement, Emmy finally tells the teacher about her learning disability and gets the needed special accommodations. She passes the test. In 1992, Max is nominated for "space cadet" in the seventh grade class superlatives because he tends to space out. However, he doesn't want to be known for having a mind that wanders off. Judy helps him realize there's nothing wrong with him. Guest stars: Julia Garcia as Emmy, Amelia Wray as Sophia, Brogan Hall as Bucky, Aaron Takahashi as Mr. Tanaka
34	13	"Crush Hour"	Robbie Countryman	Gary Murphy	June 5, 2020	221	0.39
On the last day of seventh grade, Sydney finds an unsigned note from a secret admirer in her yearbook. She enlists Olive, Emmy and Sophia to investigate who wrote it. They narrow it down to a list of seven boys, and Sydney hopes that it was written by her crush, Jake. She throws a party and invites all the suspects for interrogation. During the party, the girls successfully eliminate all the boys except Jake. Shockingly, Sydney runs into Bryce who reveals that he is the one who wrote the note. She tells him that she doesn't feel the same way. This encourages Syd to tell Jake she likes him but he reveals that he doesn't like her. Despite the disappointment, Sydney is relieved to know the truth. Back in 1992, it's Max and Leo's last day of seventh grade. They want to prank Vice Principal Virmani by buying him an exploding gift but it backfires and blows up in Max's face. Guest stars: Rizwan Manji as Vice Principal Virmani, Julia Garcia as Emmy, Amelia Wray as Sophia, Brandon Rossel as Jake, Izzy Lieberman as Bryce, Kale Culley as Ryan
35	14	"Bummer Rental"	Danielle Fishel	Kirill Baru & Eric Zimmerman	June 12, 2020	218	0.39
Max takes Sydney, Olive and Sophia to spend the Fourth of July weekend at his favorite childhood summer rental cabin. Since the cabin needs a lot of maintenance, Max starts fixing it while Sydney and her friends go to the old boat house where they run into Luke, Collin and Simon. The girls make plans to meet up with the boys but Max hires the boys to help him fix the cabin, ruining their plans. After fixing the cabin, Sydney wants to go watch fireworks with her friends and the boys but she changes her mind after realizing how much watching the fireworks with her family means to her father. In 1992, Max's father takes him, Judy and Leo to the summer cabin. Judy stays behind in the cabin to take care of Leo who is feeling unwell while Max spends time fishing with his father. Guest stars: Tom Wilson as Grandpa Doug, Amelia Wray as Sophia, Casey Sander as Billy, Max Torina as Luke, Jace Chapman as Simon, Elijah M. Cooper as Collin
36	15	"My Best Friends' Ending"	Jon Rosenbaum	Kirill Baru & Eric Zimmerman	June 19, 2020	207	0.42
Emmy is upset with Sophia for missing her aerial arts show to meet with another girl and lying that she was sick. This leads to a fight that lasts for days despite Sydney and Olive's attempts to get them back together. Sydney and Olive try to hang out with each of them without the other's knowledge, but they fail due to a scheduling mixup. Tired of being forced to choose sides, they make a presentation showing how sad their lives will be without Emmy and Sophia. This helps Emmy and Sophia realize how much they all need each other. Meanwhile, Judy and her classmates use Max as their Psychology test subject to see how long he can go before having a meltdown if they keep studying at the smoothie shop for days without buying anything. In 1992, Max and Leo contribute money to get a pair of new cool sneakers to share but Max accidentally destroys them. Guest stars: Julia Garcia as Emmy, Amelia Wray as Sophia, Brogan Hall as Bucky, Jared Wernick as Clark
37	16	"Sing It On"	David Kendall	Aaron Wiener	June 26, 2020	219	0.41
When Sydney expresses interest in spending the summer working on her music, Judy wants for her to attend a music camp while Max wants to turn the cafe into a performance space for her and other songwriters to perform. Sydney wants to go to the camp but doesn't want to hurt Max's feelings by leaving him behind. She decides to tell him through a song but Max thinks the song is about Olive. She complains to Olive about it backstage without realizing that the microphone is on and Max can hear them. In 1992, Judy offers to pay for Max and Leo to go to a summer camp but Max wants to stay home. Judy and Leo set up a backyard camp to convince Max it would be fun. However, Max doesn't want to leave his mother behind.
38	17	"Rock the Float!"	David Kendall	Cailan Rose	July 17, 2020	220	0.30
Sydney and her friends win a competition to build a float for the Spring Parade. Olive, Emmy and Sophia want to make it a mother-daughter project but are reluctant at first because Sydney doesn't have a mother. While building the float, Sydney notices how her friends keep fighting with their mothers over little differences. She reminds them that they are lucky to have their mothers, which guilts them into agreeing with everything their mothers say. Watching these complex mother-daughter dynamics makes her realize how much she misses her mother. She dedicates the float to her. In 1992, when Max sees a girl with Rollster shoes which can be used to skate and walk at the same time, he asks Judy to buy him a pair but she refuses because they are too dangerous. So, he asks his father for the shoes behind Judy's back. Guest stars: Ginifer King as Angela, Tricia O'Kelley as Deb Rozalski, Myrna Velasco as Mimi, Julia Garcia as Emmy, Amelia Wray as Sophia
39	18	"The Big Rozalski"	Ian Reed Kesler	Maegan McConnell & Heather Wood	July 24, 2020	208	0.51
Olive enlists Sydney to help look for her phone in the "Bro Zone", a hangout room Olive is not allowed to enter by her four brothers. However, they are caught by two of her brothers, Josh and Rusty. Sydney encourages Olive to stand up to them and challenges them to a video game where the winner gets to have the Bro Zone. Grandma Judy, who is secretly a video game expert, teaches the girls how to play, leading them to their victory. Instead of kicking her brothers out after winning, Olive invites them to continue using the room because all she wanted is to be included. In 1992, Max is addicted to a new arcade game where he has the highest score. Judy confronts Max about it but when Max challenges her to play him, she beats him and ends up addicted to the game. Guest stars: Brogan Hall as Bucky, Kyle Red Silverstein as Rusty, Braxton Herda as Josh
40	19	"When Harry Met Sydney"	Danielle Fishel	Emily Hirshey	August 7, 2020	209	0.28
Sydney's childhood friend Harry moves back to Portland after spending years in London, and soon after, Olive notices how cute he is and believes him to be her potential boyfriend. Sydney soon comes to realize Olive is right about Harry, and develops feelings for him and tries to find a way to confess her feelings. Max also bonds with Harry's dad Randy, who has developed a British outlook due to the time spent in London, and tries to bring his old self back. In the end, Harry reveals he too has feelings for Sydney, but his mom's job fell through and they have to move back to London, but they promise to stay in touch. In 1992, Max and Leo get walkie talkies and believe they're contacting aliens who want to abduct Earth. Guest stars: Connor Falk as Harry, Michael Dunn as Randy, Jennifer Kim as Sarah
41	20	"Look Who's Rocking"	Danielle Fishel	Gary Murphy	August 14, 2020	212	0.28
Sydney and Olive get Grandma Judy a ticket to see her favorite rockstar, Davey Rogers, who gives Judy his phone number and asks her out on a date. Weeks later, Davey invites Max, Sydney and Olive to an exclusive club. The girls become suspicious that Davey might be cheating on Judy with a woman named Portia. Sydney confronts them about it but Davey reveals that Portia is his real estate agent, helping buy a house for him and Judy to settle down together. Judy is grateful but turns him down because she is not ready to settle down. In 1992, Max and Leo want to invite their friends over to play Mighty Gladiators while Judy is out at a Davey Rogers concert. Unfortunately, Judy falls sick on the day of the concert and has to stay home, ruining the boys' plans. Guest stars: Brogan Hall as Bucky, Jennifer Taylor as Portia, Kasey Mahaffy as Terrance
42	21	"Thirteen Candles"	Jon Rosenbaum	Denise Moss	August 21, 2020	216	0.36
On her thirteenth birthday, Sydney receives an envelope from her mother. It turns out that before her death, Alisha had planned a special scavenger hunt for Sydney's thirteenth birthday. In the quest, Sydney, Olive and Max follow thirteen clues to lead Sydney to her birthday present. Sydney and Max keep arguing about him thinking she is still a child, but Sydney realizes that she needs to hold on to some of her childhood things when one of them turns out to be the key to solving the last clue. In 1992, Max overhears Judy and Leo planning his surprise thirteenth birthday party and helps them plan it. He wants a party without girls but Leo's visiting cousin, Al comes over. At first, Max is upset with Al but he ends up liking her after bonding over a prank. He later learns that Al's real name is Alisha. Guest stars: Rizwan Manji as Vice Principal Virmani, Julia Garcia as Emmy, Amelia Wray as Sophia, Brogan Hall as Bucky, Cassidey Fralin as Young Alicia

=== Season 3 (2021) ===
No. overall	No. in season	Title	Directed by	Written by	Original release date	Prod. code	U.S. viewers (millions)
43	1	"Tearin’ Up My Room"	Robbie Countryman	Denise Moss	March 19, 2021	301	0.36
After returning from a music camp, Sydney feels that she has outgrown her childhood bedroom. She asks Max to let her redo her room to reflect her new bold, risk-taker personality. With Olive's help, they repaint the room without following any rules but Max does not like it. Sydney and Olive later realize they hate it too but Sydney is afraid to admit to Max that she was wrong. When she eventually tells him the truth, Max understands and asks Sydney to take the time she needs to find her new room style. In 1993, Max and Leo are excited for their first day as eighth graders but Max becomes insecure that he is the shortest student in the grade. He starts spending time with a shorter boy, Benny, to help him look taller. Benny helps him realize that no one cares about his height. Guest stars: Dallas Durpree Young as Benny, Arjun Sriram as Pete, Megan Skiendiel as Tamira
44	2	"A Few Good Mentors"	Robbie Countryman	Gary Murphy	March 26, 2021	302	0.26
Sydney and Olive become mentors for sixth-graders Lucy and Jordan respectively. While Jordan is a confident model who ends up inspiring Olive instead, Lucy is new to the school and hasn't made any friends yet. Afraid of turning out like her own mentor, Sydney wants to be a great mentor by doing everything for Lucy. To help her make friends, Sydney and Olive trick Lucy into a friend date with Jordan but Lucy gets upset after finding out that Sydney thinks she is incapable of making friends. Sydney later apologizes and Lucy thanks her for being a great mentor and a big sister. Back in 1993, Max and Leo are assigned separate class schedules because they usually goof off together instead of paying attention in class. They don't like the new arrangement at first, but they later realize that it is for their own good after seeing their grades improve. Guest stars: Rizwin Manji as Vice Principal Virmani, Nyah Marie Johnson as Lucy, Lumi Pollack as Jordan, Dalila Ali Rajah as Mrs. Richardson, Audrey Cymone as Kendra
45	3	"He's All That"	Robbie Countryman	Emily Hirshey	April 2, 2021	303	0.29
When Harry moves back to Portland, Sydney expects him to ask her out but he doesn't. After realizing that Harry still likes her but is acting uninterested to play it cool, Olive, Emmy and Sophia advise Sydney to pretend she's not interested in him as well. Harry wants to invite Sydney to a school dance but they end up missing it because they are both pretending to be uninterested. This forces them to open up and admit they like each other. In 1993, when Leo's cousin, Alisha, moves in to live with them, Max asks Alisha to work with them at the arcade. However, jealous of Max replacing him with Alisha, Leo fires her. Max quits in protest, forcing Leo to apologize and rehire Alisha. Leo suspects that Max has a crush on Alisha. Guest stars: Julia Garcia as Emmy, Amelia Wray as Sophia, Cassidey Fralin as Young Alisha, Connor Falk as Harry, Reid Sharpiro as Iggy, Michael Dunn as Randy
46	4	"Three Amigas and a Harry"	Danielle Fishel	Kirill Baru & Eric Zimmerman	April 9, 2021	304	0.27
Hoping to spend time with both her friends and her boyfriend, Sydney invites Harry to a Four Amigas game night. However, it ends up ruining the game night because Harry doesn't know their side rules. Next, Sydney invites her friends to watch Harry's favorite baking show but they ruin it for him because they keep talking. Sydney becomes worried that her friends might never get along with her boyfriend. The next day, when Olive, Sophia and Emmy run into Harry at the bike shop, they apologize to each other and end up bonding over how stubborn Syd is. In 1993, when Max accepts to be Alisha's subject for a health class experiment instead of going to a skate park, Leo concludes that Max has a crush on Alisha but he denies it. However, Max admits that Leo was right when Alisha hugs him after the experiment, making him realize that he has feelings for her. Guest stars: Julia Garcia as Emmy, Amelia Wray as Sophia, Cassidey Fralin as Young Alisha, Connor Falk as Harry, Michael Dunn as Randy
47	5	"Boy Story"	Danielle Fishel	Nick Rossitto & Patrice Asuncion	April 16, 2021	305	0.26
Sydney has been spending so much time with Harry that she has no time to study with Olive, Emmy and Sophia. Her friends become concerned when Sydney's grades begin slipping. After going through his social media, the Four Amigas find out that Harry has not made any friends since he moved back to Portland. Realizing that she is holding Harry back from having a social life, Sydney breaks up with him. Back in 1993, Alisha applies for a job at the new science store but Max does not want her to leave because he likes her. So, he decides to sabotage Alisha's chances of getting the job by lying to her prospective employer that she is a bad employee. However, this only makes the store want to hire Alisha more after realizing that Max is lying to keep her working at the arcade. Guest stars: Julia Garcia as Emmy, Amelia Wray as Sophia, Cassidey Fralin as Young Alisha, Connor Falk as Harry, Alison Fernandez as Chloe, Jack Foley as Darwin
48	6	"My Own First Enemies"	Danielle Fishel	Cailan Rose	April 23, 2021	306	0.28
After hearing Sydney perform, a young fan asks her to post her music online. Olive helps Sydney film and post her first music video on YouTube which gets a lot of likes. She posts a second video but is discouraged when it receives a lot of negative comments. To please her fans, she tries to change her style to what she thinks they want but Max convinces her to continue singing from the heart instead of changing herself for other people. Meanwhile, Judy helps Max sign up for an online dating app. In 1993, Alisha and Bucky convince Max to join an instant messaging website. Afraid of being rejected, Max uses the website to tell Alisha he likes her more than a friend. They agree on a lunch date but he later realizes that he had been messaging with Bucky, who has a similar screen name. Guest stars: Cassidey Fralin as Young Alisha, Brogan Hall as Bucky, Camille Chen as Georgia Absent: Christian J. Simon as Leo
49	7	"The Hair Switch Project"	Morenike Joela	Kourtney Richard	April 30, 2021	309	0.27
When Sydney's lab partner Jada asks her why she straightens her hair, Sydney begins to question her hairstyle and wants to embrace her natural Black hair. She learns that she started straightening her hair after her mother died. She struggles to figure out her natural hair number but finds it too complicated. With no one else in the family who understands the complexities of Black hair, she reaches out to Grandma Maya who takes her to a Black hair salon and helps her choose a new hairstyle. In 1993, Alisha struggles to tell her mother, Maya, that she does not want to straighten her hair for a school picture day. When Alisha finally tells her that she prefers her natural curly hair, Maya explains that straight hair will help her look professional and get job opportunities. However, Alisha convinces Maya that instead of changing their hair to fit in with White people, they should embrace their Black beauty. Guest stars: Julia Garcia as Emmy, Cassidey Fralin as Young Alisha, Carlease Burke as Grandma Maya, Nakia Burrise as Nina, Shakira Ja'nai Paye as Kellyn, Princess Kimico Mapp as Jada Absent: Ava Kolker as Olive, Christian J. Simon as Leo
50	8	"The Bat Mitzvah Planner"	David Kendall	Mark Reisman	May 7, 2021	307	0.20
Olive is so stressed over her Bat Mitzvah party theme changes that she misses an appointment with her rabbi to go over her speech. After learning from Rabbi Feller what it means to become a woman in the Jewish traditions, Sydney urges Olive to focus on her speech instead of the party. On the day of the Bat Mitzvah, the roads are flooded, forcing Rabbi Feller to cancel the ceremony. Olive gets upset but Sydney comes up with an idea to throw a virtual party instead. After reading from the Torah, Olive gives a heartfelt speech about finding gratitude in difficult times. She asks her virtual guests to donate to a local relief fund instead of sending her gifts. In 1993, Leo and Max participate in a radio contest to meet their favorite rapper, MC Gavel for Leo's birthday. After losing the contest, Max helps Leo meet the rapper. Guest stars: Julia Garcia as Emmy, Amelia Wray as Sophia, Tricia O'Kelley as Deb, Eden Riegel as Rabbi Feller, Kash Abdulmalik as Bouncer, Kyle Red Silverstein as Rusty, Braxton Herda as Josh
51	9	"Man! I Feel Like a Genius"	Jon Rosenbaum	Gary Murphy	May 14, 2021	310	0.30
Olive is selected to join an advanced Math class because she is one of the best students but Sydney begs to join the class despite her poor performance. Unable to keep up with the class, Sydney keeps calling Olive for help, leaving her no time to study. As a result, Olive underperforms in her test and blames Sydney for it. She calls her out for joining a class she can't handle just so she can brag about it. This leads to a fallout but Sydney eventually apologizes to Olive and goes back to her regular class. In 1993, Alisha invites Max to go rollerskating with her but Max is a skateboarder and has never used roller skates. Ashamed of admitting he doesn't know how to skate, he insults skating, which offends Alisha. When he finally tells her the truth, Alisha offers to teach him how to skate. Guest stars: Cassidey Fralin as Young Alisha, Nicole J. Butler as Ms. Williams Absent: Christian J. Simon as Leo
52	10	"What's Eating Olive Rozalski?"	Jon Rosenbaum	Eric Zimmerman & Kirill Baru	June 4, 2021	311	0.34
Olive has been sleeping over at Sydney's because she is scared to face the reality of her parents getting divorced. Sydney offers to listen but Olive is not ready to talk. The next day, Olive has a meltdown during the Emergency Preparedness Club signup but when Sydney asks to talk about it, Olive insists that she is okay. Max tells Sydney to just be there for her and Olive will talk when she is ready. During a dinner with the Reynolds, Olive has another meltdown after realizing that her own family is falling apart. As a child of divorce, Max helps Olive understand that she will be okay despite her family changing. In 1993, Max gets his hopes up after seeing his divorced parents getting along. He tells Alisha about it and she helps him make them a romantic dinner. However, after realizing what he is up to, Judy and Doug explain to Max that getting along does not mean they are getting back together. Guest stars: Tom Wilson as Doug, Tricia O'Kelley as Deb, Cassidey Fralin as Young Alisha, Reid Shapiro as Iggy, Audrey Cymone as Kendra Absent: Christian J. Simon as Leo
53	11	"Do the Write Thing"	Raven-Symoné	Patrice Asuncion & Nick Rossitto	June 11, 2021	312	0.33
Sydney, Olive and Emmy are upset after noticing that for their American heroes project, Ms. Anderson assigned them heroes based on their race. Emmy explains that this is microaggression where people hurt minorities in subtle ways even without meaning to. They reach out to other classmates who are also hurt by the assignments and racial stereotypes. The group nominates Sydney to talk to Ms. Anderson about it, but the teacher tries to justify her choices. To stand up to Ms. Anderson, Sydney leads her classmates to choose their own heroic figures instead of being defined by their race. In 1993, a reporter interviews Leo and Alisha's computer club and assumes that Max is the president because he is the only white student in it. Leo, the actual founder and president of the club is upset by the hurtful assumption. He talks to Vice Principal Virmani who reveals that he has faced racial discrimination as well. Virmani encourages Leo to confront the reporter and demand a corrected article. Guest stars: Rizwan Manji as Vice Principal Virmani, Julia Garcia as Emmy, Cassidey Fralin as Young Alisha, Jama Williamson as Ms. Anderson, Paul-Mikél Williams as Ned, Arjun Sriram as Pete, Josh Duvendeck as Mr. Ames, Grace Lu as Roxanne, Cali Dicapo as Callie
54	12	"Cool Intentions"	Ian Reed Kesler	Denise Moss	June 18, 2021	313	0.24
Sydney is happy to be left home with Grandma Judy since she lets her do anything she wants. She convinces Judy to let her invite Olive and Emmy over for a new Ricky Angelo video game on a school night. After unlocking a live midnight concert, Sydney lies to Judy that Olive and Emmy's parents are okay with them staying over. On learning that Sydney lied to her, Judy becomes upset and sends the girls home. Instead of apologizing, Sydney blames Judy for ruining her night. When Max returns, he tells Sydney he used to take advantage of Judy. This causes Sydney to feel guilty and apologize to Judy for betraying her trust. In 1993, Judy accuses Max of breaking her vase and grounds him despite Max insisting that he is innocent. Leo tries to help prove Max is innocent but fails. They later realize that the vase broke because Judy banged the door. Judy admits that she should not always assume Max is guilty. Guest stars: Julia Garcia as Emmy, Lauren Pritchard as Donna
55	13	"A Crush of Their Own"	David Kendall	Emily Hirshey	June 25, 2021	314	0.30
When Max develops a crush on Sydney's bass teacher, Gemma, Sydney enlists Olive who helps find out that Gemma is recently single. Sydney sets Gemma on a date with Max. They date for a couple days but Gemma breaks up with Max when her ex-boyfriend comes to town. Sydney tries to get them back together but they figure out what she is up to. Even though he is heartbroken by the break up, Max says that Gemma helped him realize he can love again. In 1993, Leo develops a crush on Max's science tutor, Danielle, and keeps coming over to spend time with her. He asks Max to fail a test on purpose so that they can spend more time with her but Max passes the test without intending to. With encouragement from Max, Leo tells Danielle he loves her but Danielle says that she does not feel the same way. Guest stars: Jolie Jenkins as Gemma, Sanai Victoria as Danielle
56	14	"The Hunt for the Rad October"	Jon Rosenbaum	Aaron Wiener	October 8, 2021	TBA	0.14
On Halloween, the Four Amigas plan to win the costume festival at school, but they find they are the only ones in costume there, and are teased by Ned about it. To avoid being embarrassed, they decide to have an adult Halloween party in the Girl Cave, but Emmy ruins the fun. The girls decide to go trick-or-treating one last time but going unrecognizable, only for Olive to reveal their identities when they get to Ned's house. However, the girls soon change their mind when a trick-or-treater tells them she doesn't care what others think, and they celebrate Halloween their original way. In 1993, young Max and Leo decide to go trick-or-treating in different cheap costumes to get all the candy they want. Guest stars: Julia Garcia as Emmy, Amelia Wray as Sophia, Paul-Mikél Williams as Ned
57	15	"Jingled Out"	Caroline Rhea	Cailan Rose	October 15, 2021	315	0.18
Max wants a jingle to promote Reynolds Rides, so Sydney insists on writing it. After the first two she writes gets rejected, Sydney eventually gets tempted into quitting, just as she wrote a third version, however, Olive ends up saving the day by sending the third jingle over to Max, who actually loves it and knows it'll fit for the store. In 1993, Leo receives some magician's equipment from his Uncle, who recently got married. Young Max suggests that the two become a magic duo, promising to take on the responsibility of being Leo's partner. However, when his skateboarding tournament gets rescheduled, Leo was forced to do a magic performance with Judy's assistance. When Young Max finally arrives at the end, though, Leo berates him for flaking out on him and wants to go solo. However, he eventually changes his mind, after Young Max apologizes and states that he will fix his mistake.
58	16	"Honey, You Shrunk the Fit"	Danielle Fishel	Nick Rossitto & Patrice Asuncion	October 22, 2021	316	0.14
Sydney is asked to represent a popular clothing brand called "Britney Nashville". At first, she is super excited and is happy that the clothes are all "one size fits all". That is, until she realizes that is completely false and almost all of the clothes she was sent do not fit her. She comes up with an idea to put clips on the back of the clothes to make them look like they fit for photos. Sydney is sent a new dress that Zoey, the manager of Britney Nashville, wants her to wear at her next musical performance. Sydney and Olive go for a run, as an attempt to make Sydney fit into the new dress. She tries it on and it is too tight for her. Sydney insists on wearing it, but Olive tells her she's gone too far and that she can't change the way she looks. Sydney agrees that her body isn't the problem and that it's the clothes. She shows up to her next performance in a refashioned version of the dress, with clothes she cut up from Britney Nashville to make it fit her. Zoey later admits that the clothes don't fit her either and that she's going to bring up ideas at the next design session and thanks Sydney for inspiring her. In 1993, a popular wrestler named Mr. Concrete visits the arcade and young Max wishes he had muscles like him. With the help of Leo, Max finds ways to try to get muscular such as excessive workouts. When that doesn't work, he stuffs socks inside his arms to give himself fake muscles. He does this to impress Alisha, who is ultimately not impressed. Alisha reassures him that he already flexes his biggest muscle, which is his heart. This makes Max feel better and he watches a wrestling match with Alisha on TV. Guest stars: Cassidey Fralin as Young Alisha, Georgia Leva as Zoey
59	17	"Family Buy"	Leonard R. Garner Jr.	Denise Moss and Gary Murphy	October 29, 2021	317	0.17
When their great aunt Helen passes away, the Reynolds get money from her will and are asked to spend it on something they would never ask for. Sydney is then forced to choose between Max wanting a boat and Judy wanting a hot tub, as they both try to persuade her choice by bringing in the items they chose, triggering an argument between Max and Judy. Later, Judy reveals to Max that while she was raising him as a single mother, there were times that they were barely getting by. Max and Judy reconcile and Sydney decides to get a hot tub on a boat. In 1993, young Max wants to attend a rap concert with Leo and his music class, but Judy says no. Wanting to show her how many times she has said no to him, the two boys make a rap song about it, but Judy does not change her mind.
60	18	"My Cousin Lexi"	Raven-Symoné	Kourtney Richard	November 5, 2021	318	0.15
Sydney is excited to spend time with her seven-year-old cousin Lexi, who'll be staying for a few days while her parents are at South Africa. The Reynolds find that Lexi's stay is more pleasant than they thought it would be, when she introduces some antics she learned in her hometown in Savannah, Georgia. However, after attending a party with her friends the next night, Sydney comes home to find Lexi feeling homesick. After making a vow to always be there for each other, Sydney, along with Max and Judy, surprise Lexi by bringing her pet horse Winston to their backyard, where Max agrees to allow him to stay at the house as well. In 1993, Alisha returns from her visit in Baltimore, but gets the idea on wanting to move back there, much to Young Max's dismay. He and Leo try to change her mind, by showing all the great things she enjoys in Portland, but to no avail. In the end, Alisha decides not to move to Baltimore, stating that she'll miss her family and Max more than anything. Guest stars: Cassidey Fralin as Young Alisha, Aniya Simone as Lexi
61	19	"Praise Your Voice"	Robbie Countryman	Cailan Rose	November 12, 2021	319	0.26
Lexi has the Reynolds attend a Sunday church, though they haven't been to one in a while. During the session, a singer named Dominique inspires Sydney. When Lexi insists on her singing next week, Sydney starts to practice, only to get so nervous, she pretends she lost her voice. However, Lexi eventually sees through this and decides to take Sydney's place. During the performance, Sydney gets moved by Lexi's voice so much, she decides to join her on stage, much to everyone's surprise. In 1993, Alisha and her friends sign up for a performance at the poetry slam, by young Max's suggestion. However, her friends get sick days before the night, and Alisha becomes nervous to sing on her own. However, with Max's encouragement, she manages to do well on stage. Guest stars: Cassidey Fralin as Young Alisha, Aniya Simone as Lexi, Tijuana Ricks as Pastor Moore, Giovanna Bush as Tia, Mirabelle Lee as Nia
62	20	"Pie Hard"	Jody Margolin Hahn	Emily Hirshey	November 19, 2021	320	0.19
Lexi introduces the special sweet potato praline pie to the Reynolds. By Sydney's suggestion, Lexi decides to sell the pie, which grabs a lot of attention. While Lexi takes Winston out to a senior center, Sydney tries to make an order of four pies with Olive's help, but her first attempt failed. This upsets Sydney, as her mom had never taught her the family recipe the same way her maternal grandmother taught her. When Lexi comes home, she insists on teaching Sydney how to make it, and the second attempt becomes a success with Grandma Maya's approval. In 1993, Alisha and her younger sister Essence try to bake the sweet potato praline pie for Maya, only to make it a competition after struggling to understand the family recipe. They have Max and Leo try the pies, and they state that they're both bad. This prompts Alisha and Essence to get a store-bought pie instead. In return, Maya decides to teach her daughters how to properly make the pie. Guest stars: Carlease Burke as Grandma Maya, Cassidey Fralin as Young Alisha, Aniya Simone as Lexi, Ayaamii Sledge as Essence
63	21	"Any Given Sunday Brunch"	David Kendall	Kirill Baru & Eric Zimmerman	November 26, 2021	321	0.33
The Reynolds decide to host a Sunday brunch before Lexi has to head back to Savannah. However, they soon learn that their date falls on the same one as a woman named Lydia. After she bribes the Pastor to come to their brunch, Sydney, Lexi, Olive, Max, and Judy start preparing before the next Sunday, only for Winston to destroy all their hard-work. After informing Lydia, she insists on helping the Reynolds out. When Sydney asks why, Lydia states that the community is always there for those in need. While Judy and Lexi attend church, the family runs out of supplies, so by Lydia's suggestion, they decide to borrow some from the neighbors. Their Sunday brunch becomes a success, and the entire church celebrates. In 1993, Alisha leaves Essence in Max and Leo's care, where she overhears them talking about Max's crush on Alisha. He tries to bribe Essence into not telling him off, but with Leo's encouragement, Max decides to confess to Alisha himself. Later on, Alisha walks in on Max telling Essence not to mention his crush. Alisha then reveals that she had a crush on Max for a while now, too. Guest stars: Cassidey Fralin as Young Alisha, Aniya Simone as Lexi, Tijuana Ricks as Pastor Moore, Angel Laketa Moore as Lydia Robinson, Ayaamii Sledge as Essence
