= Thalia Tran =

American actress

- Born: Newport Beach, California, U. S.
- Occupation: Actress
- Years active: 2016–present

Thalia Tran is an American actress best known for her roles as Little Noi in Raya and the Last Dragon (2021), Charlotte Perry in Council of Dads (2020), Raina in Little (2019), and Mai in Avatar: The Last Airbender (2024). She has also appeared in Tiny Feminists (2016), Brat TV's Hotel Du Loone (2018) and Disney Channel's Sydney to the Max (2020).

== Early life ==
Tran was born in Newport Beach, California and is of Vietnamese descent. As a child, Tran took vocal lessons. Her vocal teacher recommended for her to take acting lessons to improve her performance skills. She is also able to play the piano and guitar.

== Filmography ==
=== Film ===
Year	Title	Role	Notes
2019	Little	Raina	
2021	Raya and the Last Dragon	Little Noi	Voice role

=== Television ===
Year	Title	Role	Notes
2016	Tiny Feminists	Linda	Recurring role; 3 episodes
2018	Hotel Du Loone	Sadie	Episode: "Sleepover"
2020	Council of Dads	Charlotte Perry	Main role; 10 episodes
2020	Sydney to the Max	Suzi Harrison	Episode: "Girls II Women"
2022	Station 19	Maddy	Episode: "Dancing with Our Hands Taid"
2024–present	Avatar: The Last Airbender	Mai	9 episodes
