= Lexy Kolker =

American actress (born 2009)

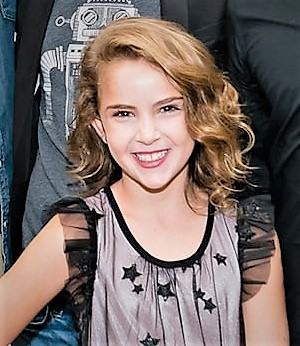
- Kolker in 2018
- Born: Alexa Rose Kolker; August 17, 2009 (age 17); Los Angeles, California, U.S.
- Occupation: Actress
- Years active: 2015–present
- Relatives: Ava Kolker (sister)

Alexa Rose Kolker (born August 17, 2009) is an American actress. She starred as Chloe in the science fiction thriller film Freaks (2018), which earned her a Young Artist Award and a Saturn Award nomination. Prior to this, she had recurring roles as Mary Swagger on the television series Shooter (2016–2018) and Robin Hinton on the television series Agents of S.H.I.E.L.D. (2017–2018).

== Early life ==
Alexa Rose Kolker was born on August 17, 2009 in Los Angeles, California, and is the youngest of four sisters. Kayla (b. 1998), Jade (b. 2001) and Ava Kolker (b. 2006), who is also an actress and introduced her younger sister to the business. Ava is best known for her roles in American Horror Story and Girl Meets World. Both sisters played the character of young Robin Hinton in Marvel's Agents of S.H.I.E.L.D.; Lexy in six episodes (2017 and 2018) and Ava in one episode (2018).

== Career ==
Kolker made her acting debut in 2015, in an episode on the crime drama television series Criminal Minds. In 2016, she appeared in the independent action film Female Fight Squad, and in the same year received recognition for playing Mary Swagger, the daughter of Bob Lee Swagger on the action television series Shooter, which was a recurring role that she held throughout the entirety of the show's run. For Shooter, she earned a Young Entertainer Award nomination. In 2017, Kolker was cast in a recurring role on the superhero television series Agents of S.H.I.E.L.D. as Robin Hinton, which she played until 2018.

In 2018, Kolker starred as Chloe in the science fiction–based action film Freaks. The film was released across several film festivals and theatres, and her performance earned positive reviews from critics and audiences alike. Variety magazine wrote that "relative newcomer Kolker carries the film effortlessly." Justin Lowe of The Hollywood Reporter stated that her "semi-improvised performance couldn't be any more authentic", and Collider described her acting as "truly unforgettable work". For the role, she won the Young Artist Award for Best Young Actress in a Feature Film, and received a nomination at the 2021 Saturn Awards for Best Performance by a Younger Actor.

Also in 2018, Kolker appeared as Lily in the Netflix fantasy film The Little Mermaid; filming was done in Savannah, Georgia in 2016 and was released in 2018 to mixed reviews from critics. In 2019, she appeared in the independent mystery crime film The Case of Jonas Booker as Marley. Kolker starred in the television series For Nothing as Lilliana Pieri, as well as the drama film Manifest West, where she will star as Riley Hayes alongside her sister Ava Kolker.

== Filmography ==
=== Film ===
Year	Title	Role
2016	Female Fight Squad	Lily
2017	Our Little Secret	Monkey
2018	The Little Mermaid	Lily
2018	Freaks	Chloe Lewis
2019	The Case of Jonas Booker	Marley
2022	Manifest West	Riley Hayes

=== Television ===
Year	Title	Role	Notes
2015	Criminal Minds	Tatiana	Episode: "Awake"
2016	Rachel Dratch's Late Night Snack	Herself	Episode: "Sex, Drugs, and Fairytales"
2016–2018	Shooter	Mary Swagger	Recurring role
2017	Searchers	Young Fable	Television film
2017–2018	Agents of S.H.I.E.L.D.	Robin Hinton	Recurring role (season 5)
2020	For Nothing	Lilliana Pieri	Main role

== Awards and nominations ==
Year	Award	Category	Work	Result	Ref
2016	Young Entertainer Award	Best Recurring Young Actress 9 and Under in a Television Series	Shooter	Nominated	
2020	Young Entertainer Award	Best Leading Young Actress in a Feature Film	Freaks	Nominated	
2020	Young Artist Awards	Best Young Actress in a Feature Film	Freaks	Won	
2021	Saturn Awards	Best Performance by a Younger Actor	Freaks	Nominated	
