= Karen Leigh Hopkins =

American screenwriter and director

- Born: United States
- Occupations: Screenwriter, actress, film director
- Writing career
- Language: English
- Genres: Film, television
- Notable work: Stepmom

Karen Leigh Hopkins is an American screenwriter, director, and producer known for her work in film and television. She wrote the screenplays for Welcome Home, Roxy Carmichael (1990), Stepmom (1998), and Because I Said So (2007). Hopkins also wrote and directed Miss Meadows (2014), a dark comedy starring Katie Holmes that premiered at the Tribeca Film Festival.

== Early life ==
Hopkins grew up in Sandusky, Ohio.

== Career ==
While working as an actress, Hopkins was cast in The Breakfast Club but her scenes were cut from the final film. Her first screenplay,The Kindness of Strangers, was written in 12 days and sold to Paramount Pictures by an executive who recognized her name from The Breakfast Club, creating an unexpected bridge from her acting to her screenwriting career.

=== Film and television ===
Hopkins' first produced feature was Welcome Home, Roxy Carmichael (1990), directed by Jim Abrahams and starring Winona Ryder and Jeff Daniels. She later co-wrote the screenplay for Stepmom (1998), a drama about blended families starring Julia Roberts and Susan Sarandon. She also wrote the romantic comedy Because I Said So (2007), featuring Diane Keaton and Mandy Moore.

In 2014, Hopkins wrote and directed Miss Meadows, a film about a prim schoolteacher who leads a secret life as a vigilante. Miss Meadows was Hopkins’s directorial debut and was filmed in and around Cleveland, Ohio in just under three weeks. The movie starred Katie Holmes and premiered at the Tribeca Film Festival.

She served as a consulting producer and co-wrote two episodes of the Apple TV+ series Little Voice, which was created by her Stepmom co-writer Jessie Nelson with original music by Sara Bareilles.

=== Awards ===
Hopkins received a Humanitas Prize in the Children's Live-Action category for co-writing the teleplay Searching for David's Heart, which aired on ABC Family in 2005. She also received an Emmy nomination for Outstanding Writing in a Children's Special for the Showtime TV movie What Girls Learn.

=== Current projects ===
According to interviews, Hopkins is developing multiple original projects, including a horror feature titled lil holly o, a film for Sony called Twisted Sister, and a series with Netflix titled Aqua Tofana.

== Filmography ==
=== Film ===
Year	Title	Role(s)	Notes
1990	Welcome Home, Roxy Carmichael	Writer, Executive Producer	
1998	Stepmom	Screenwriter	Co-writer
2007	Because I Said So	Screenwriter	
2014	Miss Meadows	Writer, Director, Executive Producer	Premiered at Tribeca Film Festival
2020	Love Is Love Is Love	Screenwriter	Segment: "Late Lunch"

=== Television ===
Year	Title	Role(s)	Notes
2001	What Girls Learn	Teleplay	Lifetime TV movie
2001	A Woman's a Helluva Thing	Writer, Director	Made-for-TV movie starring Penelope Ann Miller
2004	Searching for David's Heart	Co-writer	Won Humanitas Prize (Children's Live-Action)
2020	You Can't Take My Daughter	Writer, Producer	Lifetime TV movie
2020	Little Voice	Writer, Consulting Producer	Apple TV+ – 2 episodes written, 9 episodes produced

=== Acting Roles ===
Year	Title	Role	Notes
1983	Going Berserk	Aerobics Leader	
1984	Cloak & Dagger	Receptionist	
1987	The Running Man	Brenda	
1994	Corrina, Corrina	Liala Sheffield	
1995	Dillinger and Capone	Ragtop Blonde	
2007	Because I Said So	Milly's Staff #2	Cameo

=== In Development ===
Title	Role(s)	Notes
Aqua Tofana	Creator, Writer	Netflix series based on a 17th-century Italian poisoner
Twisted Sister	Writer	Feature film in development with Sony Pictures
lil holly o	Writer, Director	Horror feature in development
