= Stepmom (1998 film) =

1998 film directed by Chris Columbus

- Theatrical release poster
- Directed by: Chris Columbus
- Screenplay by: Gigi Levangie; Jessie Nelson; Steven Rogers; Karen Leigh Hopkins; Ron Bass
- Story by: Gigi Levangie
- Produced by: Wendy Finerman; Chris Columbus; Mark Radcliffe; Michael Barnathan
- Starring: Julia Roberts; Susan Sarandon; Ed Harris; Jena Malone
- Cinematography: Donald M. McAlpine
- Edited by: Neil Travis
- Music by: John Williams
- Production companies: Columbia Pictures; 1492 Pictures; Wendy Finerman Productions
- Distributed by: Sony Pictures Releasing
- Release date: December 25, 1998
- Running time: 125 minutes
- Country: United States
- Language: English
- Budget: $50 million
- Box office: $159.8 million

Stepmom is a 1998 American comedy-drama film directed by Chris Columbus and produced by Wendy Finerman, Mark Radcliffe, and Michael Barnathan. The screenplay was written by Gigi Levangie, Jessie Nelson, Steven Rogers, Karen Leigh Hopkins, and Ron Bass. The film stars Julia Roberts, Susan Sarandon, and Ed Harris. Its plot follows a terminally ill woman dealing with her ex-husband's new lover, who will soon be their children's stepmother.

Stepmom was released in the United States on December 25, 1998, by Sony Pictures Releasing. The film received mixed reviews from critics and grossed $159.8 million worldwide against a budget of $50 million. Among other accolades, Sarandon was nominated for a Golden Globe Award for Best Actress in a Motion Picture – Drama for her performance.

== Plot ==
Jackie and Luke Harrison are a divorced New York City couple who are struggling to co-parent their two children, daughter Anna and son Ben. Luke, an attorney, is living with his girlfriend of one year, Isabel Kelly, a successful fashion photographer several years his junior.

Isabel, who has never wanted to be a mother, tries hard to make Anna and Ben feel comfortable. Anna repeatedly rejects her overtures while Ben, who likes her, adds extra complications with his mischief. Isabel behaves with contempt tempered by caution around Jackie, believing she overcompensates for the divorce by spoiling her children.

Jackie, a former publisher turned stay-at-home mother, treats Isabel coldly, seeing her as an immature, selfish, overly ambitious career woman. She also continues to harbor malice towards Luke, as seen in confrontations about Isabel's parenting.

After many arguments and hurt feelings involving Isabel, Jackie, and Anna, Luke proposes to Isabel, making her Anna and Ben's future official stepmother. This causes even more friction between the children and adults respectively.

It is later revealed that Jackie has been silently battling lymphoma for some time, and the results of her latest scans say the disease is now terminal. She experiences a range of negative emotions, specifically jealousy of the woman who she feels is replacing her, and anger that after all of the sacrifices made for her children, she will never see them grow up. Jackie actively sabotages Isabel's efforts to bond with the children, even to the point of refusing to allow Isabel to take Anna to see Pearl Jam and then later taking her to the concert herself.

Isabel and Anna's relationship eventually improves, and they bond over shared hobbies: music and painting. One day, after bringing back Ben from a birthday party, Isabel confronts Jackie, so she informs Luke and the children of her diagnosis, resulting in Anna emotionally storming out. That night, Jackie loosens up the tension by singing and dancing to "Ain't No Mountain High Enough" with Ben, soon joined by Anna too.

Both Jackie and Isabel continue to have disagreements, largely over Isabel's parenting. When Ben goes missing on Isabel's watch, Jackie threatens legal action and claims to have never lost him, which she later admits to be untrue. At school, Anna is consistently bullied by a boy she once liked and the two women give her conflicting advice, causing more tension.

Jackie later invites Isabel to have dinner with her, and they work out a shaky truce, coming to terms with Jackie's impending death and Isabel's role as a stepmother. They bond when Isabel reveals her admiration of Jackie's maternal instincts, while Jackie in turn praises Isabel's hipness as a means to connect with Anna.

Isabel finally lets her guard down when she tells Jackie her biggest fear is that on Anna's wedding day, all she will wish for is her mother's presence, while Jackie admits her own fear is that Anna will forget her. They come to understand that while Jackie will always have the children's past, Isabel will have their future, and the children can love them both without choosing.

On Christmas morning, the family gathers to celebrate together. Jackie, now largely bedridden, shares emotional moments with her children individually, telling them that she will remain with them as long as they remember her. Isabel takes a family portrait of Luke and Jackie with the children. Jackie demonstrates her acceptance of Isabel by inviting her to join them, stating, "Let's get a photo with the whole family." Isabel sits next to Jackie for the photo, with both women holding hands, finally at peace with each other.

== Cast ==
- Julia Roberts as Isabel Kelly, Luke's current girlfriend
- Susan Sarandon as Jackie Harrison, Luke's ex-wife
- Ed Harris as Luke Harrison
- Jena Malone as Anna Harrison, Jackie and Luke's daughter
- Liam Aiken as Ben Harrison, Jackie and Luke's son
- Lynn Whitfield as Dr. Sweikert
- Darrell Larson as Duncan Samuels
- Mary Louise Wilson as school counselor
- Andre Blake as Cooper
- Jack Eagle as craft service man

== Reception ==
=== Box office ===
Stepmom opened at number two at the North American box office behind Patch Adams, making $19.1 million on its opening weekend. It stayed at the second spot for another week. The film grossed $91,137,662 in the United States and $159,710,793 worldwide from a budget of $50 million.

=== Critical response ===
Stepmom received mixed reviews from critics. On the review aggregator website Rotten Tomatoes, the film holds an approval rating of 44% based on 93 reviews, with an average rating of 5.3/10. The website's critics consensus reads, "Solid work from Julia Roberts and Susan Sarandon isn't enough to save Stepmom from a story whose manipulations dilute the effectiveness of a potentially affecting drama". On Metacritic, the film holds a weighted average score of 58 out of 100, based on reviews from 21 critics, indicating "mixed or average" reviews. Audiences polled by CinemaScore gave the film an average grade of "A" on an A+ to F scale.

=== Accolades ===
Award	Date of ceremony	Category	Recipient(s)	Result	Ref.
Blockbuster Entertainment Awards	June 16, 1999	Favorite Actress – Drama	Julia Roberts	Won	
Blockbuster Entertainment Awards	June 16, 1999	Favorite Actress – Drama	Susan Sarandon	Nominated	
Blockbuster Entertainment Awards	June 16, 1999	Favorite Supporting Actress – Drama	Jena Malone	Nominated	
BMI Film & TV Awards	January 1, 1999	BMI Film Music Award	John Williams (also for Saving Private Ryan)	Won	
Golden Globe Awards	January 24, 1999	Best Actress in a Motion Picture – Drama	Susan Sarandon	Nominated	
Kids' Choice Awards	May 1, 1999	Favorite Movie Actress	Julia Roberts	Nominated	
National Board of Review	December 8, 1998	Best Supporting Actor	Ed Harris (also for The Truman Show)	Won	
San Diego Film Critics Society	December 18, 1998	Best Actress	Susan Sarandon	Won	
Satellite Awards	January 17, 1999	Best Actress – Motion Picture Drama	Susan Sarandon	Nominated	
Teen Choice Awards	August 1, 1999	Choice Drama Movie	Stepmom	Nominated	
Young Artist Awards	March 6, 1999	Best Performance in a Feature Film: Leading Young Actress	Jena Malone	Won	
Young Artist Awards	March 6, 1999	Best Performance in a Feature Film: Young Actor Age Ten or Under	Liam Aiken	Won	
Young Artist Awards	March 6, 1999	Best Family Feature Film: Drama	Stepmom	Won	
YoungStar Awards	November 7, 1999	Best Young Actress in a Drama Film	Jena Malone	Won	

== Soundtrack ==
The soundtrack to Stepmom was released on August 12, 1998, via Sony Classical label.

Stepmom

Soundtrack album by John Williams
- Released: August 12, 1998
- Length: 53:30
- Label: Sony Classical
- Producer: John Williams

John Williams chronology
Saving Private Ryan (1998)	Stepmom (1998)	Star Wars Episode I: The Phantom Menace (1999)

No.	Title	Artist	Length
1.	"Always and Always"	John Williams	3:41
2.	"The Days Between"	John Williams featuring Christopher Parkening	6:27
3.	"Time Spins Its Web"	John Williams	2:19
4.	"The Soccer Game"	John Williams	4:27
5.	"A Christmas Quilt"	John Williams	3:56
6.	"Isabel's Horse and Buggy"	John Williams	1:28
7.	"Taking Pictures"	John Williams featuring Christopher Parkening	3:12
8.	"One Snowy Night"	John Williams	5:33
9.	"Ben's Antics"	John Williams	3:04
10.	"Isabel's Picture Gallery"	John Williams	3:44
11.	"Jackie and Isabel"	John Williams featuring Christopher Parkening	2:59
12.	"Jackie's Secret"	John Williams	3:32
13.	"Bonding"	John Williams	3:55
14.	"Ain't No Mountain High Enough"	Marvin Gaye and Tammi Terrell	2:29
15.	"End Credits"	John Williams	6:16
Total length:			53:30

=== Certifications ===
Region	Certification	Certified units/sales
Spain (Promusicae)	Gold	50,000^{^}
^{^} Shipments figures based on certification alone.

== Home media ==
The film was released on DVD and VHS on April 27, 1999 by Columbia TriStar Home Video. The film was released in Blu-ray on March 7, 2017, and also as part of a Blu-ray Disc double feature with The Deep End of the Ocean from Mill Creek Entertainment on June 4, 2019.

== See also ==
- The Other Woman (1995 TV film)
