= Manifest West =

- Theatrical release poster
- Directed by: Joe Dietsch; Louie Gibson
- Written by: Joe Dietsch; Louie Gibson
- Produced by: Bryson Pintard
- Starring: Lexy Kolker; Annet Mahendru; Milo Gibson; Michael Cudlitz; Tim Heidecker
- Distributed by: Samuel Goldwyn Films
- Release date: February 6, 2022 (Mammoth)
- Running time: 91 minutes
- Country: United States
- Language: English

Manifest West is a 2022 American thriller drama film written and directed by Joe Dietsch and Louie Gibson and starring Lexy Kolker, Annet Mahendru, Milo Gibson, Michael Cudlitz and Tim Heidecker.

== Plot ==
Struggling with financial pressures and the effects of a family tragedy, Dave and Alice choose to move their family from suburban life, to live off-grid in the remote North American wilderness. Hoping for a fresh start and to escape the pressures of society, they embrace a simpler way of life, learning survival skills to help adapt living in the wild.

Initially, the new lifestyle brings the family closer together. However, former teacher Alice has bipolar disorder, which worsens and causes unpredictable behavior. Dave believes Alice's condition can be cured with rest, and gradually becomes suspicious of outsiders. Tensions grow within the family and other nearby communities.

Concerns from local authorities and child protection services adds to the pressure. As her parents' relationship declines, Riley is forced to navigate a frightening reality in the wilderness that was meant to save them.

== Cast ==
- Milo Gibson as Dave Hayes
- Annet Mahendru as Alice Hayes
- Michael Cudlitz as Eric Lind
- Tim Heidecker as Steve Danik
- Lexy Kolker as Riley Hayes
- Ava Kolker as Lana Danik
- Madison Friedman as Mary Hayes
- Ross Turner as the Inspector
- Lorenzo Silva as Jay

== Production ==
=== Pre-production ===
Script writing started in 2019, with the premise inspired by government stand-offs in the USA during the 1990s and how those people may have chosen to live alternatively during that time. Principal photography was originally due to commence in early 2020, however shooting was postponed for two months due to the Coronavirus pandemic.

=== Casting ===
In writing and developing the character Riley, who is the film's storyteller, directors Dietsch and Gibson recalled their own childhood experiences. When deciding upon the character being a younger girl, Dietsch highlighted that they wanted to include scenes of her doing the same things similar aged boys would, rather than portraying a "princess" stereotype. In casting Riley, the writers approached agents in Los Angeles, including talent agency Coast to Coast, who recommended Lexy Kolker, describing her as a "perfect" fit. This was the first time that Lexy Kolker featured in the same film with her sister, Ava Kolker. Her on-screen sister Mary, played by Madison Friedman, is a long-term close family friend of the Kolker family.

The roles for the two adult leads were written specifically for Milo Gibson and Annet Mahendru, who are the brother and wife respectively of co-director and co-writer Louie Gibson. They were originally planning to feature together in a different film, which did not materialise. Speaking of the film, Mahendru felt it was "very hard and gut-wrenching", describing the material as difficult, particularly as they approached the "more meaty and crazy parts of the film".

== Release ==
The film premiered on February 6, 2022 at the Mammoth Film Festival, where it won the prize for Best Genre Film.

In July 2022, it was announced that the North American distribution rights to the film were acquired by Samuel Goldwyn Films.

The film was released in theaters, on demand and on digital on November 11, 2022.

== Reception ==
The film has a 63% rating on Rotten Tomatoes based on eight critic reviews.

Michael Talbot-Haynes of Film Threat rated the film an 8 out of 10 and wrote, "Manifest West is a drama that breaks through the mythology of the family picture to reach something much more primal. Pack up some provisions and start hiking to find it." Writing for Decider, John Serba felt the film was "thoughtful and well-considered", describing it as a "rock-solid drama crafted with an admirable sense of intent and purpose".
