= Welcome Home, Roxy Carmichael =

1990 film by Jim Abrahams

- Theatrical release poster
- Directed by: Jim Abrahams
- Written by: Karen Leigh Hopkins
- Produced by: Penney Finkelman Cox
- Starring: Winona Ryder; Jeff Daniels; Laila Robins; Dinah Manoff
- Cinematography: Paul Elliott
- Edited by: Bruce Green
- Music by: Thomas Newman
- Production company: ITC Entertainment Group
- Distributed by: Paramount Pictures
- Release date: October 12, 1990
- Running time: 96 minutes
- Country: United States
- Language: English
- Budget: $13 million
- Box office: $4 million

Welcome Home, Roxy Carmichael is a 1990 American comedy drama film directed by Jim Abrahams and written by Karen Leigh Hopkins. It stars Winona Ryder and Jeff Daniels. In the film, the residents of a small Ohio town prepare for the homecoming of Hollywood superstar Roxy Carmichael, including a troubled teenage girl who is convinced that Roxy is her birth mother.

== Plot ==
The residents of the small town of Clyde, Ohio, anxiously prepare for the return of Roxy Carmichael, a former resident who left for Hollywood 15 years earlier and has been invited to dedicate a new municipal building. Local resident Dinky Bossetti is an intelligent, rebellious, and unpopular 15-year-old high school student with unkempt hair and baggy dark clothes who is constantly bullied and ostracized by her classmates. Dinky feels alienated from her adoptive parents, Les and Rochelle. Rochelle is disappointed that Dinky is not traditionally feminine and plans to send her away to a boarding school for troubled youth so she and Les can have a biological child of their own.

In English class, Dinky recites a suggestive poem she wrote about her own birth, and embarrasses Gerald Howells, a popular classmate, by addressing it to him. Outraged, the teacher sends Dinky to the office of the school's new guidance counselor, Elizabeth Zaks, who recognizes Dinky's intelligence and spirit. Later, Dinky approaches Denton Webb, Roxy's old boyfriend, and asks him about Roxy. Denton confesses that he and Roxy secretly had a baby girl before she left town. He also reveals that the baby was born prematurely and that he left her at the hospital. At home, Denton and his wife Barbara argue over his fixation on Roxy, with Barbara telling Denton that Roxy never loved him. Barbara eventually leaves Denton.

Dinky and Gerald begin to develop a mutual attraction, but when she trips and falls while on the school bus one day, he fails to help her because he is sitting with another girl. When Dinky orders the driver to let her off and runs away, Gerald chases and tackles her before confessing that he likes her because of her intelligence and sense of humor. Gerald tries to kiss Dinky, but she runs off. Some time later, Dinky tells Gerald that she is convinced that Roxy is her mother and that she is leaving town with Roxy the next day.

On the day of Roxy's arrival, Elizabeth agrees to drive Dinky to Cleveland to shop for a dress for the building dedication. While meeting with a representative from the boarding school, Les and Rochelle are informed that Dinky did not go to school that day. While Rochelle calls the police, Les reminds her that Dinky is their daughter and goes to look for her. Dinky and Elizabeth hug and say goodbye, while Gerald tells Denton that Dinky believes that Roxy is her mother.

That evening at the ceremony, the townspeople eagerly await Roxy's arrival. Dinky shows up wearing a pink gown, and a limousine arrives, but the townspeople are left with a note explaining that Roxy is unable to attend. Distressed, Dinky tries to get into the limousine before Denton tells her that she is not Roxy's daughter, because the baby died shortly after birth and he personally buried her. As Dinky breaks into tears and runs, Gerald pursues her and tries to convince her that there are real people in her life who care about her, but she rebuffs him.

Later that night, Rochelle tears up the boarding school brochure, and Denton burns his Roxy memorabilia as Barbara returns home. In the morning, Dinky, still wearing her pink gown, goes to Gerald's house. They have a picnic on the front lawn and share an awkward kiss. After Dinky declares that they both have "a lot of work to do", Gerald tells her, "Welcome home, Dinky Bossetti."

== Cast ==
- Winona Ryder as Dinky Bossetti
- Jeff Daniels as Denton Webb
- Laila Robins as Elizabeth Zaks
- Thomas Wilson Brown as Gerald Howells
- Joan McMurtrey as Barbara Webb
- Graham Beckel as Les Bossetti
- Frances Fisher as Rochelle Bossetti
- Robby Kiger as Beannie Billings
- Dinah Manoff as Evelyn Whittacher
- Sachi Parker as Libby Ohlemachet
- Stephen Tobolowsky as Mayor Bill Klepler
- Micole Mercurio as Louise Garweski
- John Short as Ronald Reems
- Robin Thomas as Scotty Sandholtzer
- Valerie Landsberg as Miss Day Ashburn
- Rhonda Aldrich as Charmaine
- Ava Fabian as Roxy Carmichael
- Carla Gugino as young Roxy Carmichael
- Rob King as young Denton Webb
- Daniel Fekete as Denny Webb Jr.
- Beth Grant as Lillian Logerfield
- Heidi Swedberg as Andrea Stein
- Angela Paton as Gloria Sikes

== Production ==
Principal photography began in June 1989 and took place mostly in Clyde, Ohio, as well as in Sandusky, Ohio, and Santa Paula, California.

== Soundtrack ==
Thomas Newman composed the original score for the film, which was released on cassette and compact disc by Varèse Sarabande. Although Melissa Etheridge wrote and performed two original songs for the film—"Don't Look at Me" and "In Roxy's Eyes (I Will Never Be the Same)"—neither is included on the soundtrack album; while the former has never been released, the latter is included on her 1993 album Yes I Am as "I Will Never Be the Same".

1. "In the Closet" – 1:45
2. "Little Black Bird" – 1:23
3. "Hers Are Nicest" – 1:10
4. "Refrigerator Shrine" – 2:36
5. "Missing Bossetti Child" – 0:56
6. "Wake Up" – 1:26
7. "Clyde" – 1:44
8. "Her Limousine" – 1:57
9. "Several Letters" – 1:12
10. "Choke It" – 2:18
11. "Arriving by Aeroplane" – 0:56
12. "Cleveland" – 1:12
13. "Yours Are Nice" – 0:41
14. "Baby Soup" – 2:56
15. "In a Beauty Parlor" – 0:35
16. "G. on a Bike" – 1:06
17. "Her Majesty's Dress" – 1:22
18. "This Was My Intention" – 2:29
19. "In a Small Town" – 1:33

== Reception ==
Welcome Home, Roxy Carmichael received mixed reviews. On the review aggregator website Rotten Tomatoes, the film holds an approval rating of 54% based on 13 reviews, with an average rating of 5.4/10. On Metacritic, which assigns a weighted average score out of 100 to reviews from mainstream critics, the film received an average score of 44, based on 19 reviews, indicating "mixed or average" reviews. Audiences polled by CinemaScore gave the film an average grade of "B+" on an A+ to F scale. Roger Ebert of The Chicago Sun-Times gave the film 2 stars out of a possible 4, saying parts were convincing while others were entirely unrealistic and concluding the "movie sinks into contrived plot manipulation" rather than expand on its best moments.
