= Saving Private Ryan (soundtrack) =

Saving Private Ryan: Music from the Original Motion Picture Soundtrack

Film score by John Williams
- Released: July 21, 1998; August 28, 2018 (remaster)
- Recorded: February 21–23, 1998
- Studios: Symphony Hall, Boston and Boston Symphony Orchestra, Massachusetts
- Genre: Soundtrack
- Length: 64:13
- Labels: DreamWorks; La-La Land Records (2018 remaster)
- Producer: John Williams

John Williams chronology
Amistad (1997)	Saving Private Ryan: Music from the Original Motion Picture Soundtrack (1998)	Stepmom (1998)

Singles from Saving Private Ryan (soundtrack)
- 1. "Hymn to the Fallen" Released: 1998

Saving Private Ryan: Music from the Original Motion Picture Soundtrack is the soundtrack album for the 1998 film Saving Private Ryan, directed by Steven Spielberg. The album was produced by composer John Williams and distributed by DreamWorks Records. Recorded in Symphony Hall, Boston, Massachusetts, the scores were performed by the Boston Symphony Orchestra, with two of the ten compositions featuring vocals from the Tanglewood Festival Chorus. The soundtrack runs for just over an hour, while the film itself lasts over two hours.

Throughout the compositions, brass (especially French horns), and string instruments were used to evoke a variety of emotions and tones. The soundtrack received mixed reviews from critics, but was still nominated for several major awards, of which it won the Grammy Award for Best Instrumental Composition Written for a Motion Picture or for Television. Soundtrack opener "Hymn to the Fallen" received some radio play, in particular on the United States holidays Veterans Day and Memorial Day. The soundtrack was remastered and reissued as a commemorative twentieth anniversary edition by La-La Land Records in 2018.

== Background ==
Steven Spielberg and John Williams had worked together on fifteen films before Saving Private Ryan (1998). The score was recorded at Symphony Hall in Boston, Massachusetts with the assistance of the Boston Symphony Orchestra. After having recorded the re-edited version of Close Encounters of the Third Kind (1977) and some of Schindler's List (1993) at Symphony Hall previously, this was the third time Spielberg and Williams worked on a soundtrack at this location. Spielberg chose Symphony Hall as the site for the recording because the hall gives "rich, warm sound off the walls and ceiling" and allows you to "hear the air," which some soundstages do not allow you to do. Spielberg stated he chose to work with the Boston Symphony Orchestra because the film deals with a "company of soldiers" and the orchestra was an "experienced company of musicians." Over the course of a three-day period in February 1998, the score for the film was recorded at a rate of around $100,000 an hour.

Spielberg and Williams both watched a rough cut of the film to determine what scenes would have music. The two decided to leave music out of the fighting sequences, in favor of playing it over long sequences of eight to nine minutes that lack action. The playing of music between fighting sequences gives a moment of reflection for what happened. Tom Hanks came to a portion of the recording session and read the Bixby letter – which appears in the movie – to the orchestra at the behest of Williams. This caused the musicians to shuffle their feet in appreciation.

Williams chose to use different families and types of instruments to convey and evoke certain tones within the score. String instruments were chosen to provide a warm sound, brass instruments were utilized for "solemn" sections of the pieces, and horn instruments were used to give off a pensive tone. Military drums were used largely in the piece entitled "Hymn to the Fallen." The Tanglewood Festival Chorus provided a vocal chorus for "Hymn to the Fallen" that served as a memory to those who have fallen in combat. "Hymn to the Fallen" and its reprise are the only two tracks that feature any sort of vocals and bookend the album. Spielberg chose to place "Hymn to the Fallen" on the closing credits because it will "stand the test of time and honor forever the fallen of this war and possibly all wars" and felt it showed Williams' "sensitivity and brilliance." The album was released on July 21, 1998. The soundtrack was remastered and reissued as a commemorative twentieth anniversary edition by La-La Land Records on August 28, 2018, and included two new tracks.

== Reception ==
Professional ratings
Review scores
Source	Rating
AllMusic	2.5/5 stars
SoundtrackNet	3.5/5 stars

Author Emilio Audissino felt that the music offered no "perspective" as Williams' scores normally do, but was instead rooted in emotion. Classic FM believed that despite the restrictions placed on Williams, he still managed to create a "moving theme." Stephen Thomas Erlewine of AllMusic agreed, stating Williams added "sentiment wherever he could nonetheless." Hillel Italie of the Associated Press found the soundtrack to be "bland" and "out of place." Richard Harrington of The Washington Post found the soundtrack created by Williams to be "quietly heroic, full of survivalist determination and pragmatic melancholy." In regard to all of Williams' soundtracks for Spielberg films, Harrington believed that this soundtrack was the most "subtle." Calgary Herald writers felt Williams' created a "reflective score" that "is sensitive without sensationalizing the subject."

Ian Black of The Sun (Sheridan, Oregon) compared the music for Flags of Our Fathers (2006) with that of Saving Private Ryan stating that it was "nowhere close" to the latter. Barbera Vancheri of the Pittsburgh Post-Gazette wrote that "John Williams' symphonic score soars in the background like church music." Edmonton Journal writer Ted Shaw found the "meditative quality" of Williams' score to be a surprise when compared to the intensity of the fighting sequences. He added that the music was an "elevating" component of the film. Thomas Doherty also noted that the music "lacks the bombast of the incoming shells," stating that it was "quietly martial" with its use of trumpets and mild percussion.

In addition to the film itself, the soundtrack received several nominations for various awards. The score won the Best Instrumental Composition Written for a Motion Picture or for Television. In addition, the score was nominated for Academy Award for Best Original Dramatic Score, the Golden Globe Award for Best Original Score, and the BAFTA Award for Best Film Music, but failed to win the awards.

In 2003, the Cleveland Institute of Music published a list of uplifting classical music pieces that featured "Hymn to the Fallen" and "Omaha Beach." Within the United States, "Hymn to the Fallen" received minor radio airplay on Veterans Day and Memorial Day. Classic FM voted the soundtrack to its "Movie Music Hall of Fame" that consists of the top 100 movie soundtracks chosen by fan votes. The soundtrack placed sixteenth on the list, two places lower than the previous year. Portions of the score were used in the "No Casino Gettysburg" videos that were created in opposition of building a casino on the grounds of Gettysburg, Pennsylvania where the Battle of Gettysburg was fought.

== Track listing ==
No.	Title	Length
1.	"Hymn to the Fallen"	6:10
2.	"Revisiting Normandy"	4:06
3.	"Omaha Beach"	9:15
4.	"Finding Private Ryan"	4:37
5.	"Approaching the Enemy"	4:31
6.	"Defense Preparations"	5:54
7.	"Wade's Death"	4:30
8.	"High School Teacher"	11:03
9.	"The Last Battle"	7:57
10.	"Hymn to the Fallen (Reprise)"	6:10
Total length:		64:13

20th anniversary edition bonus tracks
No.	Title	Length
11.	"High School Teacher (Film Version)" (2018 remastered)	4:31
12.	"The Last Battle (Film Version)" (2018 remastered)	8:02

== Personnel ==
- Orchestra, performer, and primary artist: Boston Symphony Orchestra
- Scoring consultant: Sandy De Crescent
- Photography: David James
- Music preparation: JoAnn Kane
- Trumpet: Tim Morrison
- Design: Terry Roberston
- Engineer: Shawn Murphy
- Horn: Richard "Gus" Sebring
- Choir/Chorus, performer, and primary artist: Tanglewood Festival Chorus
- Editing: Ken Wannberg
- Composer, conductor, primary artist, and producer: John Williams

== Release history ==
List of release dates, formats, label, editions and reference
Date	Format(s)	Label(s)	Ref(s)
July 21, 1998	CD	DreamWorks Records	
2014	Digital download	Dreamworks SKG	
August 28, 2018	CD	La-La Land Records	
