= Miss Meadows =

2014 American dark comedy film

- Theatrical release poster
- Directed by: Karen Leigh Hopkins
- Written by: Karen Leigh Hopkins
- Produced by: Eric Brenner; Rob Carliner
- Starring: Katie Holmes; James Badge Dale; Callan Mulvey; Stephen Bishop
- Cinematography: Barry Markowitz
- Edited by: Joan Sobel
- Music by: Jeff Cardoni
- Production companies: Myriad Pictures; Rob Carliner Films
- Distributed by: Entertainment One Films
- Release dates: April 21, 2014 (Tribeca Film Festival); November 14, 2014 (United States)
- Running time: 88 minutes
- Country: United States
- Language: English
- Budget: $3 million

Miss Meadows is a 2014 American dark comedy thriller film written and directed by Karen Leigh Hopkins. The film stars Katie Holmes, James Badge Dale, Callan Mulvey and Stephen Bishop. The film was released on November 14, 2014, by Entertainment One Films.

== Plot ==
Miss Mary Meadows is a young woman who works as a substitute first-grade elementary school teacher. She enjoys taking long walks in her suburban neighborhood, wearing floral clothing, gloves and tap-dancing shoes. She drives a 1956 Nash Metropolitan.

Unknown to everyone, she is a secret vigilante who kills local thugs who accost her or when she witnesses them committing crimes. She always carries a small semi-automatic pistol in her purse and speaks in a childlike, innocent manner. She lives by herself in a small house and talks occasionally with her mother over the telephone about what she did during the day.

Investigating the vigilante killings is a local sheriff. (Note: The Sheriff is never named, and billed simply as "Sheriff", though a deputy calls him 'Mike' before tossing him a tennis ball, and 'Dunn' can be read on his nameplate during the proposal scene.) He soon meets and develops an attraction to Miss Meadows due to her old-fashioned clothing and style of speech. When he begins to suspect she may be the vigilante he is looking for, he is torn between whether to arrest or protect her.

When Miss Meadows meets an ex-convict named Skylar, who she learns served time for child abuse, she begins to fear for her young students' safety. When Miss Meadows approaches and threatens to kill Skylar if he continues hanging around the school or her kids, he begins stalking her.

It is eventually revealed that all of the telephone conversations that Miss Meadows has been having with her mother over the course of the film are imaginary. As a young girl, Mary Meadows witnessed her mother's murder in a drive-by shooting outside a local church after attending the wedding of a family friend. This traumatic incident left Miss Meadows so emotionally scarred that she entered a fantasy world in which she imagined that her mother was still alive, then began to go after and kill criminals whom she viewed as a threat to society.

The various criminals that Miss Meadows kills on-screen include a trucker who tries to abduct her at gunpoint in the opening scene, a young man who committed a mass shooting at a local diner, and the town's Catholic priest, whom Miss Meadows finds sexually molesting a young boy.

When Miss Meadows learns that she is pregnant after a sexual encounter with the Sheriff, she decides to accept his proposal of marriage. On the day of the wedding, Skylar kidnaps Heather, one of Miss Meadows's students, forcing her to go to his house (wearing her wedding dress) to try to stop him. She manages to free Heather, but becomes a captive herself. Heather escapes and attracts the attention of the Sheriff, who is passing by after leaving the church and enters Skylar's house. Inside the house Skylar, finds Miss Meadows' gun in her purse and threatens her with it, but is saved by the Sheriff, who shoots him. Seeing Miss Meadows' gun still clutched in Skylar's hand, he notes "It has his prints now". He and Miss Meadows proceed back to the church.

A year later, Miss Meadows and the Sheriff are married; she still wears her tap shoes and he has taken up the accordion. Now parents to a baby daughter, they are content to be peculiar together. As Miss Meadows prepares to go out before dinner, the Sheriff tells her "Be careful"; she replies "I always am", leaves the house, and does another little tap dance on the sidewalk.

== Cast ==
- Katie Holmes as Miss (Mary) Meadows
- James Badge Dale as Sheriff Mike Dunn
- Callan Mulvey as Skylar
- Ava Kolker as Heather
- Stephen Bishop as Lt. Danny
- Graham Beckel as Tommy Weaver/Driver of Truck
- Kate Linder as Trudy Navis
- James Landry Hébert as Derek Pierson/Young Man at Weenie Stand
- James Keane as Father Peter
- Mary Kay Place as Mrs. Davenport
- Jean Smart as Mother Meadows

== Production ==
Principal photography and production began on August 6, 2013, in Cleveland, Ohio.

== Release ==
The film premiered at the Tribeca Film Festival on April 21, 2014. The film was released on November 14, 2014, by Entertainment One Films.

== Reception ==
Miss Meadows received negative reviews from critics. On the review aggregator website Rotten Tomatoes, 21% of 19 critics' reviews are positive, with an average rating of 4.50/10. On Metacritic, the film has a rating of 43 out of 100, based on 13 critics, indicating "mixed or average reviews".
