= Ruth Righi =

American actress (born 2005)

- Born: Ruth Mouma Righi; September 7, 2005 (age 21); Santa Cruz, California, U.S.
- Occupation: Actress
- Years active: 2008–present

Ruth Mouma Righi (born September 7, 2005) is an American actress. She is best known for playing Sydney Reynolds in the Disney Channel television show Sydney to the Max and voicing the title character in the Disney Junior animated show Eureka!.

== Early life ==
Ruth Mouma Righi was born on September 7, 2005, and grew up in Santa Cruz, California, United States. Her father is a musician from Djerba, Tunisia and her mother is a public school teacher from California.

== Career ==
=== Theater ===
In 2017, Righi performed in the Winter Garden Theatre's Broadway production of School of Rock, playing the roles of Marcy and Sophie. The same year, she also performed in the off-Broadway revival of Really Rosie.

=== Film and television ===
Righi made her television debut in 2018 playing a minor character in the television series Happy!

The following year, she landed a starring role in Disney Channel's Sydney to the Max as Sydney Reynolds. In addition to playing the lead role, Righi performed the theme song, "Stay the Same". The show ended in 2021 after 63 episodes.

In 2022, she took on another starring role, this time as Eureka in Disney Junior's animated show with the same name.

In early 2022, it was announced that Righi would co-star in NBC's Unbroken, alongside Jacqueline Obradors, Jon Beavers, Scott Bakula, Anna Wood, Oluniké Adeliyi, and Cress Williams. However, later in the year, NBC announced they would not move forward with the show.
