= The Trials of Cate McCall =

- Theatrical release poster
- Directed by: Karen Moncrieff
- Written by: Karen Moncrieff
- Produced by: Eric Karten; Karen Moncrieff; Marc Bienstock; Peter Schafer
- Starring: Kate Beckinsale; Nick Nolte; Clancy Brown
- Cinematography: Antonio Calvache
- Edited by: Toby Yates
- Music by: Peter Nashel
- Production companies: Pitbull Pictures; Sunrise Films
- Distributed by: Sierra/Affinity
- Release dates: November 28, 2013 (Hungary); April 4, 2014 (United States)
- Running time: 89 minutes
- Country: United States
- Language: English
- Box office: $0.25 million

The Trials of Cate McCall is a 2013 American drama film directed and written by Karen Moncrieff and stars Kate Beckinsale, Nick Nolte and Clancy Brown.

== Plot ==
Cate McCall is a lawyer, an alcoholic in recovery and on probation, and estranged from her family. In order to regain custody of her young daughter and be reinstated to the bar, she accepts the pro bono appeal of a woman, Lacey, who has been convicted of murder. Aided by her assistant, Cate pulls out all stops to prove Lacey's innocence, as well as work on her own alcohol and work addictions. Cate becomes obsessed with the case, neglecting arranged time with her daughter while she successfully gets Lacey's conviction overturned. Cate begins drinking again after learning Lacey is guilty, which makes her mistreat her kid even more. In the middle of a trial, Cate goes back to her previous position at a prestigious law firm and purposely ruins the case for her own client. Cate then takes multiple illegal actions to put Lacey back in prison. Cate gives evidence to the prosecutor who can convict Lacey, then conspires with the prosecutor; the two of them agree to keep it a secret so that she won't be disbarred, which would deny him the ability to use the evidence that he should not have. Cate does not recuse herself from Lacey's trial – though she does blackmail the original judge, who previously ruled in Lacey's favour, to recuse himself. The prosecutor, exercising prosecutorial misconduct, does not recuse himself from the case either. Cate's overt acts of fraud, conspiracy, blackmail and misconduct enable her to get Lacey re-convicted. Cate's reward for her illegal actions is to be granted shared custody of her daughter.

== Cast ==
- Kate Beckinsale as Cate McCall
- James Cromwell as Justice Sumpter
- Mark Pellegrino as Detective Welch
- Anna Anissimova as Lacey
- David Lyons as Josh
- Clancy Brown as D.A. Brinkerhoff
- Ava Kolker as Augie
- Johnny Sneed as D.A. Barker
- Jay Thomas as Cate's boss
- Joseph Lyle Taylor as Officer Duncan
- Dale Dickey as Mrs. Stubbs
- Brendan Sexton III as Rusty Burkhardt
- Isaiah Washington as Wilson George
- Michael Hyatt as Cate's lawyer
- Brad Greenquist as Dr. Ennis
- Nick Nolte as Bridges

== Production ==
The filming of The Trials of Cate McCall began on May 16, 2012, in Los Angeles.

== Release ==
=== Distribution ===
The 2012 production was not released in the United States until 2014. In June 2012 Sierra/Affinity acquired the international distribution rights to the film.

=== Box office ===
The Trials of Cate McCall performed poorly, showing total box office revenue, from foreign markets, of less than $250,000.
