= Because I Said So (film) =

- Theatrical release poster
- Directed by: Michael Lehmann
- Written by: Karen Leigh Hopkins; Jessie Nelson
- Produced by: Paul Brooks; Jessie Nelson
- Starring: Diane Keaton; Mandy Moore; Gabriel Macht; Tom Everett Scott; Lauren Graham; Piper Perabo; Stephen Collins; Colin Ferguson
- Cinematography: Julio Macat
- Edited by: Paul Seydor; Troy Takaki
- Music by: David Kitay
- Production company: Gold Circle Films
- Distributed by: Universal Pictures
- Release date: February 2, 2007
- Running time: 102 minutes
- Country: United States
- Language: English
- Budget: $39 million
- Box office: $69.5 million

Because I Said So is a 2007 American romantic comedy film directed by Michael Lehmann and starring Diane Keaton, Mandy Moore, Lauren Graham, Piper Perabo, Gabriel Macht, Tom Everett Scott and Stephen Collins. The film was released theatrically on February 2, 2007, and was unanimously panned by critics, but was a commercial success, grossing $69.5 million on a $39 million budget.

== Plot ==
Daphne Wilder is the loving, but overbearing mother of three women. Her daughters Maggie and Mae are happily married, but her youngest, Milly, recently broke up with her boyfriend, and Daphne is concerned.

Daphne fears that Milly cannot find a good man on her own, so she secretly places a personal ad on her behalf. She finds a potential candidate, Jason Grant, and tries to orchestrate a chance meeting of the two. The plan seems flawless until Milly finds her own date, guitarist Johnny Dresden, who happens to be a candidate Daphne had previously rejected. Milly is unaware of Daphne's scheming and begins relationships with both Jason and Johnny at the same time, with neither aware of the other.

Inevitably, this double-dating takes its toll and Milly becomes estranged from both Jason and Johnny. Meanwhile, Daphne stumbles upon her own perfect match with Johnny's father Joe after being alone for many years, and Milly realizes she has to choose between being the daughter Daphne wants her to be and being the woman she wants herself to be. Choosing the latter leads to a row with Daphne but when Milly reconciles with Johnny, Daphne comes to realize that this is the relationship that was meant to be in the first place.

== Cast ==
- Diane Keaton as Daphne
- Mandy Moore as Milly
- Gabriel Macht as Johnny
- Tom Everett Scott as Jason
- Lauren Graham as Maggie
- Piper Perabo as Mae
- Stephen Collins as Joe
- Colin Ferguson as Derek
- Tony Hale as Stuart

== Marketing ==
The film had a marketing tie-in allowing customers to buy panties with different sayings from the movie.

== Reception ==
=== Box office ===
In its first weekend of release, the film placed second in total box office receipts. For the weekend of February 2, 2007, the film earned $13,022,000. As of April 5, 2007; its domestic gross was $42,674,040. According to Box Office Guru, "men showed practically zero interest in the Universal release. Studio research showed that 82% of the audience was female. 55% of the turnout was 35 or older. 83% was Caucasian."

=== Critical reception ===
On the review aggregator website Rotten Tomatoes, 3% of 155 critics' reviews are positive, with an average rating of 3.4/10. The website's consensus reads: "Overly reliant on caricatures and lacking any human insight, Because I Said So is an unfunny, cliche-ridden mess." Metacritic, which uses a weighted average, assigned the film a score of 26 out of 100, based on 30 critics, indicating "generally unfavorable" reviews. Audiences polled by CinemaScore gave the film an average grade of "B-" on an A+ to F scale. William Booth of The Washington Post rated it the worst movie of 2007.

Diane Keaton's performance in the film earned her a nomination for the Golden Raspberry Award for Worst Actress, where she lost to Lindsay Lohan for I Know Who Killed Me at the 28th Golden Raspberry Awards.
