= Ava Kolker =

American teen actress and singer

- Born: Ava Grace Kolker; December 5, 2006 (age 19); Los Angeles, California, U.S.
- Occupations: Actress; singer
- Years active: 2011–present
- Relatives: Lexy Kolker (sister)

Ava Grace Kolker (born December 5, 2006) is an American teen actress and singer. Kolker's roles include Ava Morgenstern on the Disney Channel series Girl Meets World (2014–2017), and Olive Rozalski on Sydney to the Max (2019–2021). In film, she portrayed Lily in Scary Movie 5 (2013), Heather in Miss Meadows (2014), Boot in Message from the King (2016), Young Elise Rainer in Insidious: The Last Key (2018) and Rivka Rebel in ‘’ How I Met Your Father ‘’. Kolker made her music debut with the single "The Good Ones" in July 2019. She subsequently released several other songs, including "When Will It Be Tomorrow" (2020), "Eventually" (2020), "Who Do You Think You Are" (2021), "Ahead of Me" (2022), and her debut EP, Ballerina, consisting of six songs and released in June 2023.

== Early life ==
Kolker was born in Los Angeles, California, then moved one year to Florida. She has three sisters, Kayla Kolker, Jade Kolker and Lexy Kolker, also an actress, who is best known for playing Chloe in the 2018 horror film Freaks.

== Career ==
=== 2011–2014: Early roles ===
Kolker began acting in 2011 at a young age, making her debut with a guest appearance on the television horror series American Horror Story. A year later, she appeared in her first film, starring as Marybeth Geitzen in the comedy film Golden Winter.

In 2013, she was cast as Lily in the comedy horror film Scary Movie 5, the fifth installment in the Scary Movie film series, which was critically panned, but commercially successful. and in the same year appeared in the drama film The Trials of Cate McCall as Augie. In 2014, she played Heather in the thriller film Miss Meadows.

=== 2015–present: Breakthrough and current work ===
Kolker has made various guest appearances on television series such as Dads, Sam & Cat, and Black-ish. In 2015, Kolker was cast in the recurring role of Ava Morgenstern on Disney Channel's comedy television series Girl Meets World, the spinoff to Boy Meets World. For the role, she received a Young Artist Award nomination. In the year following, she appeared in the horror film The Axe Murders of Villisca as Ingrid, the action film Message from the King as Boot, and the drama television film Sister Cities as Young Austin.

In 2017, Kolker made guest appearances on the comedy series White Famous as Maddie, and the superhero series Agents of S.H.I.E.L.D. as 12-year old Robin Hinton, portraying an older version of the character who was played by her sister Lexy as an 8-year old. In 2018, Kolker was cast on the Disney Channel sitcom Sydney to the Max, playing the main character of Olive. In the same year, she appeared as Young Elise Rainier in the film Insidious: The Last Key, the fourth film in the Insidious franchise. The film was a commercial success. She also starred as Aeloo in the fantasy film A Fairy's Game.

In 2019, she was cast in a minor voice role in the film Red Shoes and the Seven Dwarfs, which will be released theatrically in September 2020. Kolker released her debut single, "The Good Ones" in July 2019. In 2020, she released the follow-up singles "Eventually" and "When Will It Be Tomorrow"; the latter of which was released through Vevo.

In June 2023, Kolker announced her debut EP Ballerina, which was released on June 23, 2023.

== Discography ==
=== Singles ===
Title	Year	Album
"The Good Ones"	2019	Non-Album Single
"Eventually"	2020	Non-Album Single
"When Will It Be Tomorrow"	2020	Non-Album Single
"Seventeen"	2021	Non-Album Single
"Who Do You Think You Are"	2021	Non-Album Single
"Ahead of Me"	2022	Non-Album Single
"All to Myself"	2022	Non-Album Single
"Knots"	2024	Non-Album Single
"the boy who"	2025	Non-Album Single
"the last time"	2025	Non-Album Single
"your daughter"	2025	Non-Album Single
"cry for utah"	2026	Non-Album Single
"London's Calling"	2026	Non-Album Single
"Home Again"	2026	

=== Extended Plays ===
Title	Year
Ballerina	2023

== Filmography ==
=== Film ===
Year	Title	Role	Notes
2012	Golden Winter	Marybeth Geitzen	
2013	Scary Movie 5	Lily Sanders	
2013	The Trials of Cate McCall	Augie	
2014	Miss Meadows	Heather	
2016	The Axe Murders of Villisca	Ingrid	
2016	Message from the King	Boot	
2016	Sister Cities	Young Austin Baxter	
2018	Insidious: The Last Key	Young Elise Rainier	
2018	A Fairy's Game	Aeloo	
2018	Red Shoes and the Seven Dwarfs	Wooden Bear Cub (voice)	
2022	Manifest West	Lana Danik	

=== Television ===
Year	Title	Role	Notes
2011	American Horror Story	Three-Year-Old Girl	Episode: "Spooky Little Girl"
2013	Dads	Little Girl	Episode: "The Glitch That Stole Christmas"
2014	Sam & Cat	Romy	Episode: "#MagicATM"
2015	Black-ish	Little Girl	Episode: "The Word"
2016	Rachel Dratch's Late Night Snack	Herself	Episode: "Sex, Drugs, and Fairytales"
2014–2017	Girl Meets World	Ava Morgenstern	Recurring role
2017	White Famous	Maddie	Episode: "Life on Mars"
2018	Agents of S.H.I.E.L.D.	12-Year-Old Robin Hinton	Episode: "The Last Day"
2019–2021	Sydney to the Max	Olive Rozalski	Main role
2021	Disney's Magic Bake-Off	Herself	Episode: "Holiday"
2022	How I Met Your Father	Rivka	Episode: "Rivka Rebel"

== Awards and nominations ==
Year	Award	Category	Work	Result	Ref
2016	Young Entertainer Award	Best Recurring Young Actress 9 and Under – Television Series	Girl Meets World	Won	
2017	Young Artist Awards	Best Performance in a TV Series – Guest Starring Young Actress	Girl Meets World	Nominated	
