= Sydney to the Max =

2019 comedy television series

- Genre: Comedy
- Created by: Mark Reisman
- Starring: Ruth Righi; Ava Kolker; Jackson Dollinger; Christian J. Simon; Ian Reed Kesler; Caroline Rhea
- Theme music composer: Kay Hanley; Michelle Lewis; Dan Petty
- Opening theme: "Stay the Same" by Ruth Righi and Dan Conklin
- Composer: Rebecca Kneubuhl
- Country of origin: United States
- Original language: English
- No. of seasons: 3
- No. of episodes: 63 (list of episodes)

Production
- Executive producer: Mark Reisman
- Producer: Kevin O'Donnell
- Cinematography: George Mooradian; Thomas T. Eckelberry
- Camera setup: Multi-camera
- Running time: 22–24 minutes
- Production companies: Mark Reisman Productions; It's a Laugh Productions

Original release
- Network: Disney Channel
- Release: January 25, 2019 – November 26, 2021

Sydney to the Max is an American comedy television series created by Mark Reisman that aired on Disney Channel from January 25, 2019 to November 26, 2021. The series stars Ruth Righi, Ava Kolker, Jackson Dollinger, Christian J. Simon, Ian Reed Kesler, and Caroline Rhea.

== Premise ==
Sydney Reynolds is a 12-year-old girl who lives in Portland, Oregon, with her father Max and her paternal grandmother Judy as she navigates life in middle school with her best friend Olive. Each half-hour episode includes a flashback segment set in 1992 that details 12-year-old Max and his friend Leo, who both work at a shopping mall arcade owned by Leo's father. Both segments show Sydney and young Max getting into similar situations.

== Episodes ==
Season	Episodes	Originally released	
Season	Episodes	First released	Last released
1	21	January 25, 2019	July 23, 2019
2	21	December 13, 2019	August 21, 2020
3	21	March 19, 2021	November 26, 2021

== Cast and characters ==
=== Main ===
- Ruth Righi as Sydney Reynolds, a sociable middle school student; her middle name is revealed to be Wallace in "As Bad as She Gets"
- Ava Kolker as Olive, Sydney's best friend who has four brothers; her last name is revealed to be Rozalski in "Good Grade Hunting"; her middle name is revealed to be Anne in "As Bad as She Gets"
- Jackson Dollinger as Young Max Reynolds, who lives with his mother Judy; his full name is revealed to be Maxwell Keith Reynolds in "As Bad as She Gets"
- Christian J. Simon as Leo, the childhood friend of Max who is seen in his flashbacks; his last name is revealed to be Webb in "The Lyin' King"; his full name is revealed to be Leonard Lawrence Webb in "As Bad as She Gets". Leo is Alisha's cousin, and thus the future first cousin once removed of Sydney.
- Ian Reed Kesler as Adult Max Reynolds, the protective father of Sydney and proprietor of the bike shop, Reynolds Rides, who has raised Sydney since his wife, Alisha, died 5 years prior to the series' 2019 events; at certain moments, he has flashbacks to his middle school days; his full name is revealed to be Maxwell Keith Reynolds in "As Bad as She Gets"
- Caroline Rhea as Judy, Sydney's spiritual grandmother and Max's mother who helps Max to raise Sydney; in flashbacks, she watches over Max while his father Doug is away working as a pilot in another city with an unpredictable work schedule

=== Recurring ===
- Rizwan Manji as Vice Principal Virmani, the vice-principal of Clara Barton Middle School who has been vice-principal since Max's childhood
- Julia Garcia as Emmy, Sydney and Olive's prideful classmate and friend; her last name is revealed to be Mendoza in "Rock the Float"
- Amelia Wray as Sophia, Sydney and Olive's classmate and friend
- Brogan Hall as Bucky, a classmate and a friend of young Max and Leo
- Cassidey Fralin as Young Alisha, cousin of Leo, future wife of Max, and future mother of Sydney; her adult self dies five years prior to the series' 2019 start

=== Notable guest stars ===
- Eric Allan Kramer as Coach Carlock, the fencing coach at Clara Barton Middle School
- Reginald VelJohnson as Principal Linkenberry, the principal at Clara Barton Middle School
- Thomas F. Wilson as Grandpa Doug, a pilot who is Max's dad and Sydney's paternal grandfather
- Megan Skiendiel as Tamira

== Production ==
The multi-camera series was green-lit by Disney Channel on September 6, 2018, and slated to premiere in early 2019. The series was created by Mark Reisman, who also serves as showrunner, executive producer, and writer. Starring in the series are Ruth Righi as Sydney Reynolds, Ian Reed Kesler as Max, Christian J. Simon as Leo, Ava Kolker as Olive, Caroline Rhea as Judy, and newcomer Jackson Dollinger as Young Max. The series is produced by It's a Laugh Productions. On November 19, 2018, it was announced that the series would premiere on January 25, 2019. The theme song is produced and written by Kay Hanley, Michelle Lewis, and Dan Petty and performed by Ruth Righi and Dan Conklin. On January 16, 2019, Disney Channel released the official opening sequence. On May 23, 2019, it was announced that Disney Channel renewed the series for a second season. On November 21, 2019, it was announced that Disney Channel renewed the series for a third season, ahead of its second season premiere. On April 1, 2022, it was reported that the series concluded production after the third season, with the final episode airing on November 26, 2021.

== Ratings ==
Viewership and ratings per season of Sydney to the Max
Season	Episodes	First aired		Last aired		Avg. viewers (millions)
Season	Episodes	Date	Viewers (millions)	Date	Viewers (millions)	Avg. viewers (millions)
1	21	January 25, 2019	0.71	July 23, 2019	0.51	0.54
2	21	December 13, 2019	0.40	August 21, 2020	0.36	0.38
3	21	March 19, 2021	0.36	November 26, 2021	0.33	0.25
