= NiNoKuni =

2019 film directed by Yoshiyuki Momose

- Theatrical release poster
- Kanji: 二ノ国
- Directed by: Yoshiyuki Momose
- Screenplay by: Akihiro Hino
- Story by: Akihiro Hino
- Based on: Ni no Kuni by Akihiro Hino of Level-5
- Produced by: Tsukasa Koitabashi
- Starring: Kento Yamazaki; Mackenyu Arata; Mei Nagano; Maaya Sakamoto; Mamoru Miyano; Yuki Kaji; Kenjiro Tsuda
- Cinematography: Ryo Kurei
- Edited by: Hitoshi Nogawa
- Music by: Joe Hisaishi
- Production company: OLM, Inc.
- Distributed by: Warner Bros. Pictures Japan
- Release date: August 23, 2019
- Running time: 106 minutes
- Country: Japan
- Language: Japanese
- Box office: $2 million

NiNoKuni (Note: Japanese: 二ノ国, Hepburn: Ni no Kuni; lit. "Second Country") is a 2019 Japanese animated action fantasy film directed by Yoshiyuki Momose based on the video game series of the same name developed by Akihiro Hino at Level-5, who also wrote and executive produced the film. Produced by OLM and distributed by Warner Bros. Pictures, the story of the film takes place centuries after the events of Ni no Kuni II: Revenant Kingdom, as it centers on two boys named Yū and Haru saving their friend Kotona from danger through Evermore's princess, Astrid. The film stars the voices of Kento Yamazaki, Mackenyu Arata, Mei Nagano, Maaya Sakamoto, Mamoru Miyano, Yuki Kaji and Kenjiro Tsuda. It was released in Japan on August 23, 2019.

Netflix acquired the streaming rights for the film, and it premiered worldwide on January 16, 2020.

== Plot ==
On their way home from basketball practice, Kotona invites Haru and Yū to a crêpe café, but Yū, who uses a wheelchair, returns home after they encounter steps on the way. Later in a back alley, Kotona notices that she is being tailed by a black hooded figure. Kotona contacts Yū, who arrives too late as the figure stabs her. Haru arrives and tries to get Kotona to the hospital, but both he and Yū are suddenly transported to an unknown world, later revealed to be the kingdom of Evermore. Yū discovers that he is able to walk there.

In Evermore Castle, the boys meet Princess Astrid, who is remarkably similar to Kotona and who is also wounded with a curse. Yū, who notices the shadow knife placed on Astrid's stomach, pulls it out and breaks the curse. That night, Haru drinks away, as he believes this to be a dream, while Yū visits Astrid again, who takes him to the Lake of Purity to dance away the remains of the curse. The next morning, Yū and Haru are summoned by the mage Gnauss and King Astrum, who make them engage in swordplay against multiple men in order to find out if they were sent by a group known as Black Banner. Yū and Haru jump towards the flame behind the king, and are transported back to their world, where they reunite with Kotona.

A few days later, with Haru still believing it was all a dream, Yū tries to find an old man he met at the hospital during his childhood, but a nurse tells him he has disappeared. Kotona reveals she has a malignant tumor, and only has three months to live. Yū proposes returning to the other world, but Haru, in grief and anger, suggests killing Astrid to save Kotona. As the feud goes on, the same black hooded man transports the two to the other world.

Haru ends up in a dismal wasteland, and meets Galeroth, leader of the Black Banner, who makes Haru join his invasion of Evermore. Yū, on the other hand, ends up back in Evermore Castle's throne room, and tries to reason with the king. Gnauss appoints Yū as a defender, and makes him prove his innocence by killing Haru. As the invasion begins with Black Banner's army overwhelming Evermore's soldiers, Astrid proposes using the Mornstar (Gladion in the Japanese), the sword of Evermore. However, Gnauss and the King reveal that the one in their possession is a counterfeit, while the real one disappeared long ago. The two boys briefly fight, but as they are about to kill each other, they are transported back to their own world again.

Back in their world, Saki, Yū's adopted sister, is confronted by the same black hooded man at her florist shop when the boys arrive and manage to save her. As they escape in her car, the man transforms into a gigantic spider and pursues them. As Saki reveals to the boys that the man called her name, Yū has an epiphany and realizes the culprit. As they manage to escape from the monster, the car is pulled into the river, with the boys transported back to the other world once again.

In the throne room, the boys confront Gnauss, who is the mastermind behind everything that has happened since Astrid's curse. Gnauss reveals that he is in fact Galeroth, and that he was once known as Crown Prince Sedulus Astrum. He has been plotting to take revenge on his father and the entire kingdom, and attempts to manipulate Haru through his armor which Yū is able to stop with his magic. Galeroth takes Astrid hostage, and tries to kill her, only for Yū to shield the attack. As Astrid and Haru fight Galeroth, the old man (Note: Heavily implied to be Oliver, the protagonist from Dominion of the Dark Djinn and it enhanced remake, Wrath of the White Witch.) reappears before Yū, and gives him an old stick; which later is revealed as the legendary Mornstar. Both Yū and Haru slay Galeroth with the sword, defeating him and the Black Banner army for good. A portal appears before them; after a tearful farewell, Haru leaves through the portal, with Yū staying behind.

Back in Haru's world, both Kotona and Saki have recovered from their retrospective causes, but their memories of Yū fade. As the only one who remembers Yū and realizing their similar preferences, Haru realizes that Yū was his doppelganger from the other world.

In a post-credits scene, Yū, with Astrid at his side, is crowned as the new king of Evermore.

== Voice cast ==
| Character | Japanese voice cast | English voice cast |
|---|---|---|
| Yū | Kento Yamazaki | Max Mittelman |
| Haru | Mackenyu Arata | Alejandro Saab |
| Kotona/Princess Astrid | Mei Nagano | Abby Trott |
| Saki/Bertha | Maaya Sakamoto | Erica Lindbeck |
| Gnauss Wissden | Mamoru Miyano | Robbie Daymond |
| Galeroth | Kenjiro Tsuda | Armen Taylor |
| Barton | Kōichi Yamadera | Patrick Seitz |
| Dandy | Yuki Kaji | Kyle McCarley |
| King Astrum | Masatō Ibu | John Snyder |
| Old man | Tsuyoshi Muro | John DeMita |

== Production ==
=== Development ===
In February 2019, Warner Bros. Japan announced at a press conference that Level-5 was producing an anime film based on Ni no Kuni. Yoshiyuki Momose, who provided various storyboards and key animations for many of Studio Ghibli films, as well as serving as an animation director for Dominion of the Dark Djinn and a character designer for Revenant Kingdom, was announced as the main director for the film with OLM, Inc. handling the animation production. Level-5's Akihiro Hino, who created and wrote the Ni no Kuni video game series, served as an executive producer, story and screenwriter for the film.

=== Casting ===
Kento Yamazaki was the first cast member to be announced during the press conference. Other cast members were revealed that same month, with Maaya Sakamoto as Saki/Bertha, Mamoru Miyano as Gnauss, Kenjiro Tsuda as Galeroth, Kōichi Yamadera as Barton, and Yuki Kaji as Dandy. Mackenyu Arata and Mei Nagano were cast as Haru and Kotona respectively. Masatō Ibu and Toshiyoshi Muro were later cast as King Astrum and the Old Man.

=== Music ===
Joe Hisaishi returned to score the music for the film, after composing the music for Dominion of the Dark Djinn, Wrath of the White Witch and Revenant Kingdom. The film's theme song is "MOIL", sung by Keina Suda.

== Release ==
The film was released in theaters in Japan on August 23, 2019. Netflix released the film internationally on January 16, 2020.

== Reception ==
The film debuted at seventh place at the weekend box office, and dropped to tenth in its second week.
