= Music of Ni no Kuni =

Music of video game series

The music for the role-playing video game series Ni no Kuni, developed by Level-5 and published in Western regions by Bandai Namco Entertainment, is primarily composed by Joe Hisaishi and performed by the Tokyo Philharmonic Orchestra. Hisaishi, known for his previous work on Studio Ghibli films, agreed to work on the games after witnessing the development team's passion for the project. He aimed to make the music reflect the fantasy genre, creating a compatibility between the soundtracks and the game worlds.

An album titled Ni no Kuni: Shikkoku no Madoushi Original Soundtrack was released in Japan in February 2011, featuring music from Ni no Kuni: Dominion of the Dark Djinn. A two-disc soundtrack was later released in March 2013; the first disc is a re-release of the Japanese soundtrack, while the second disc contains additional tracks from Ni no Kuni: Wrath of the White Witch. Critical reception to the soundtracks have been positive, as reviewers felt that the music for the first two games connected appropriately with the gameplay, with critics stating that Hisaishi's contributions matched the art style by Studio Ghibli. Hisaishi would later return to compose for Ni no Kuni II: Revenant Kingdom, with its soundtrack releasing in June 2018.

== Production and composition ==
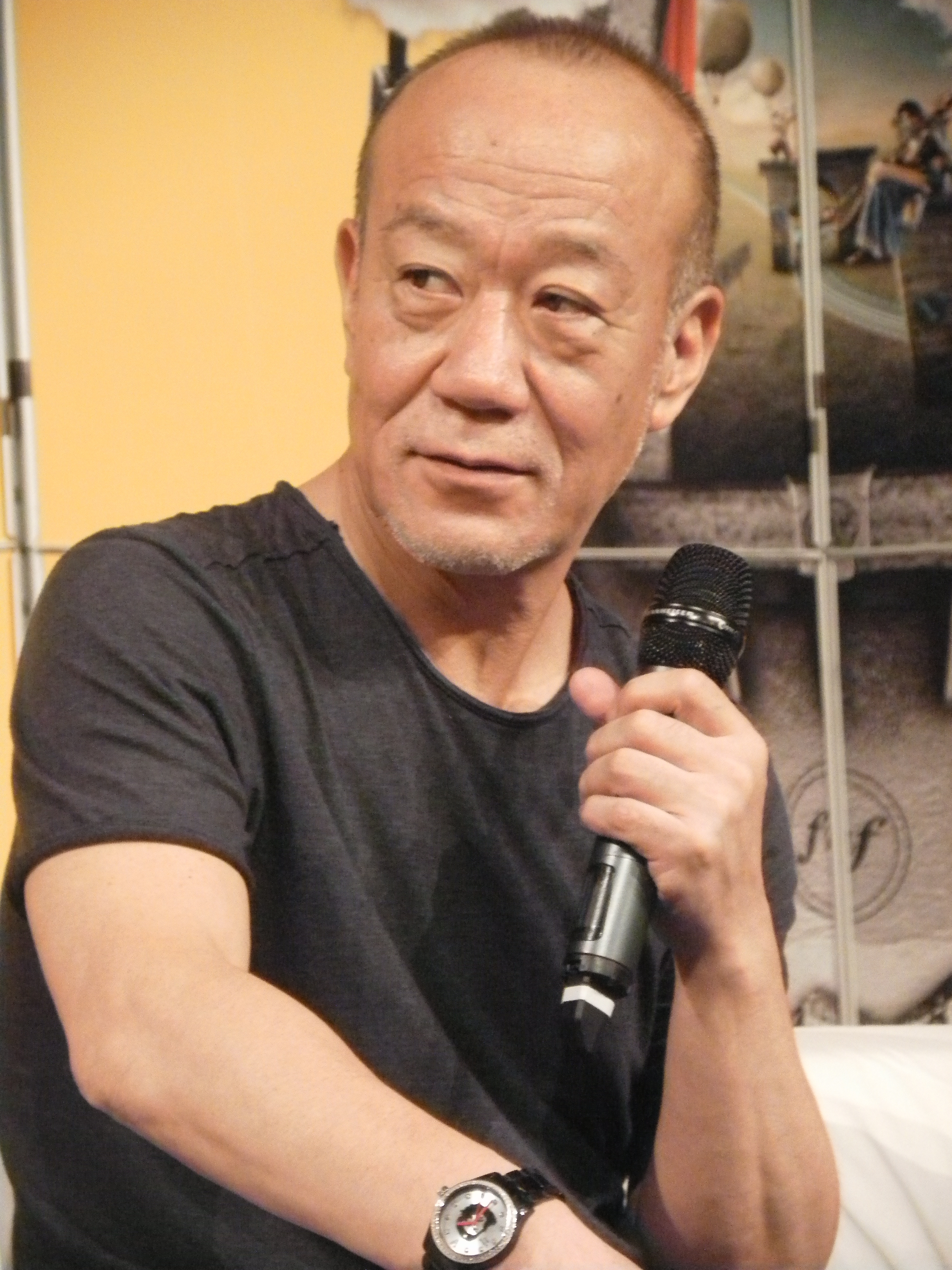
Japanese musician Joe Hisaishi, who previously worked on Studio Ghibli films, serves as lead composer for the series.

When Studio Ghibli agreed to produce the animated sequences of Ni no Kuni, they contacted Joe Hisaishi to work on the game music. Hisaishi, who previously worked with Studio Ghibli on films such as Princess Mononoke (1997) and Spirited Away (2001), met with Level-5 producer and writer Akihiro Hino. After witnessing Hino's passion for the project, Hisaishi agreed to work on the soundtrack. Rei Kondoh created the other half of the score, and all in-game music was performed by the Tokyo Philharmonic Orchestra. "Kokoro no Kakera", the games' theme song, was written by Hisaishi; his daughter Mai Fujisawa performed the song in Japanese, while chorister Archie Buchanan performed the English version. The team found great difficulty in selecting a performer for the English version, though ultimately settled upon Buchanan due to his ability to convey the "vulnerability and innocence" of the games' characters in a "moving and powerful performance". For the orchestral music to fit onto the Nintendo DS at a high quality, Ni no Kuni: Dominion of the Dark Djinn was shipped on a 4-gigabit game card.

Hisaishi wrote 21 songs as piano sketches, across seven days. He found that the rhythm of the score was more complex than expected, but felt that this is "usually a good sign", which encouraged him to continue. The music was intended to reflect the fantasy genre, and contain an elegance based on traditional folk music of Ireland; Hisaishi described the music as "nostalgic, but still connected to the future". Hisaishi also felt a compatibility between his music and the world that the development team was creating, stating that their ideas generally worked naturally in "perfect unison".

For the soundtracks, the piano was performed by Febian Reza Pane, the lute by Hiroshi Kaneko, the sitar by Masahiro Itami, the whistle by Hideyo Takakuwa, and the tabla by Ikuo Kakehashi. All music was recorded at Yokohama Minato Mirai Hall by Avaco Creative Studio, while Wonder Station mixed the soundtrack at Azabu-O Studio. Hiroyuki Akita oversaw the former, as recording engineer. Hisaishi would also return to work on the score for Ni no Kuni II: Revenant Kingdom.

== Albums ==
=== Ni no Kuni: Shikkoku no Madoushi Original Soundtrack ===
Ni no Kuni: Shikkoku no Madoushi Original Soundtrack

Soundtrack album by Joe Hisaishi
- Released: February 9, 2011
- Studio: Yokohama Minato Mirai Hall
- Genre: Soundtrack
- Length: 54:37
- Labels: FRAME; PKCF-1036

Ni no Kuni: Shikkoku no Madoushi Original Soundtrack consists of music from Ni no Kuni: Dominion of the Dark Djinn, composed by Joe Hisaishi and performed by the Tokyo Philharmonic Orchestra. The soundtrack spans twenty-one tracks, covering a duration of 55 minutes. FRAME published the album on February 9, 2011.

In the context of the game, the soundtrack was well received. Michael Baker of RPGamer found the game's music to be "top-notch", noting its appropriation for gameplay. Patrick Gann of RPGFan called the soundtrack "beautiful", comparing it favorably to Koichi Sugiyama's work on the Dragon Quest series. RPGLand's Janelle Hindman lauded the music as "gorgeously crafted", appreciating the lack of electronic or synthesized songs, and Gigazine named it "magnificent". Nintendo Gamer's Matthew Castle lauded the music, favorably comparing it to film soundtracks.

No.	Title	Length
1.	"Ni no Kuni Main Theme"	3:19
2.	"Morning of Beginning"	2:35
3.	"Hotroit"	2:11
4.	"Incident Occurrence!"	2:23
5.	"Arie ~Recollection~"	2:10
6.	"Shizuku"	1:39
7.	"Mighty Magic"	2:01
8.	"Field"	3:36
9.	"Neko Kingdom's Castle Town"	2:45
10.	"Desert Kingdom's Town"	3:03
11.	"Imperial March"	2:23
12.	"Crisis"	1:12
13.	"Tension"	1:18
14.	"Battle"	2:22
15.	"Jabo, the Black Wizard"	2:45
16.	"Imargen Battle"	2:37
17.	"Labyrinth"	2:33
18.	"To The Decisive Battle"	3:21
19.	"Final Battle"	3:22
20.	"Miracle ~Reunion~"	2:50
21.	"Fragments of Hearts"	4:12
Total length:		54:37

=== Ni no Kuni: Wrath of the White Witch ‒ The Original Soundtrack ===
Ni no Kuni: Wrath of the White Witch ‒ The Original Soundtrack

Soundtrack album by Joe Hisaishi
- Released: March 29, 2013
- Studio: Yokohama Minato Mirai Hall
- Genre: Soundtrack
- Length: 86:21
- Labels: Wayô Records; WAYO-003~4

Ni no Kuni: Wrath of the White Witch ‒ The Original Soundtrack consists of music from Ni no Kuni: Wrath of the White Witch, composed by Hisaishi and performed by the Tokyo Philharmonic Orchestra. The soundtrack spans two discs; the first disc is a re-release of the Japanese soundtrack, with twenty-one tracks, while the second disc contains twelve additional tracks from Ni no Kuni: Wrath of the White Witch. Both discs cover a duration of 87 minutes. Wayô Records published the soundtrack on March 28, 2013.

"Kokoro no Kakera"
"Kokoro no Kakera", the game's main theme, was composed by Joe Hisaishi and performed by his daughter Mai Fujisawa. Chorister Archie Buchanan performed the English version of the theme.

In the context of the game, the soundtrack was well received. Colin Moriarty of IGN felt that it was appropriate in every situation, praising its ability to create emotion and involve players in the experience. GameTrailers found the soundtrack "powerful", commenting on its appropriate use during gameplay, and GamesRadar's Brittany Vincent named it "breathtaking". Jen Bosier of Forbes approved of the soundtrack's usage within the game, particularly praising the piano pieces. James Stephanie Sterling of Destructoid favorably compared the soundtrack to Dragon Quest VIII, praising the orchestral qualities and "sense of fun". Chris Scullion of Computer and Video Games wrote that the music ensures the game "sounds as good as it looks". Robert Steinman of RPGFan felt that the music perfectly sets the tone of the game, stating that it is among "some of the best work" of video game music, and Jasmine Rea of VentureBeat found that the music "enhances the overall Ghibli quality" to the game. Eurogamer's Oli Welsh called the music "a lush and romantic treat", though criticized the repetitiveness of the battle music. Kirk Hamilton of Kotaku echoed similar remarks, heavily criticizing the battle music, but otherwise calling the music "uncommonly gorgeous".

Ni no Kuni: Wrath of the White Witch received nominations at the 2011 International Film Music Critics Association, 2014 SXSW Gaming Awards and Spike VGX 2013, and from Destructoid and GameTrailers. The game's main theme, "Kokoro no Kakera", also won the award for Original/Adapted Song at the 13th National Academy of Video Game Trade Reviewers Awards.

Disc 1
No.	Title	Length
1.	"Ni no Kuni: Dominion of the Dark Djinn – Main Theme"	3:19
2.	"One Fine Morning"	2:35
3.	"Motorville"	2:11
4.	"The Accident"	2:23
5.	"In Loving Memory of Allie"	2:10
6.	"Drippy"	1:39
7.	"Magic with Oomph"	2:01
8.	"World Map"	3:36
9.	"Ding Dong Dell -The Cat King's Castle-"	2:45
10.	"Al Mamoon -Court of the Cowlipha-"	3:03
11.	"Imperial March"	2:23
12.	"Crisis"	1:12
13.	"Tension"	1:18
14.	"Battle"	2:22
15.	"Shadar, the Dark Djinn"	2:45
16.	"A Battle with Creatures"	2:37
17.	"Labyrinth"	2:33
18.	"The Lead-Up to the Decisive Battle"	3:21
19.	"The Showdown with Shadar"	3:22
20.	"Miracle –Reunion-"	2:50
21.	"Kokoro no Kakera (Japanese Version)"	4:12
Total length:		54:37

Disc 2
No.	Title	Length
1.	"Ni no Kuni: Wrath of the White Witch – Main Theme"	3:39
2.	"The Fairyground"	2:03
3.	"Mummy's Tummy"	1:36
4.	"Battle II"	2:17
5.	"The Horror of Manna"	3:09
6.	"Unrest"	1:51
7.	"Blithe"	2:11
8.	"Sorrow"	2:29
9.	"The Zodiarchs"	2:51
10.	"The Final Battle Against the White Witch"	2:43
11.	"The Wrath of the White Witch"	2:43
12.	"Kokoro no Kakera -Pieces of a Broken Heart- (English Version)"	4:13
Total length:		31:45

=== Ni no Kuni II: Revenant Kingdom Original Soundtrack ===
Ni no Kuni II: Revenant Kingdom Original Soundtrack

Soundtrack album by Joe Hisaishi
- Released: June 6, 2018
- Genre: Soundtrack
- Labels: Avex Entertainment; AVCD-55174; Wayô Records; WAYO-010

Ni no Kuni II: Revenant Kingdom Original Soundtrack consists of music from Ni no Kuni II: Revenant Kingdom, again composed by Hisaishi and performed by the Tokyo Philharmonic Orchestra. It was released by Avex Entertainment in Japan and worldwide by Wayô Records on June 6, 2018.

Disc 1
No.	Title	Length
1.	"Theme from Ni no Kuni II"	4:03
2.	"The Toppled Throne"	1:33
3.	"The Escape"	1:44
4.	"Let Battle Commence"	2:08
5.	"Leavetaking"	1:50
6.	"The Curious Boy"	1:53
7.	"The Great Outdoors"	1:42
8.	"Into the Fray"	2:05
9.	"Here Come the Higgledies!"	1:40
10.	"Treacherous Valley"	1:39
11.	"Boss Battle"	1:37
12.	"To Arms!"	1:42
13.	"Forest of Mysteries"	2:56
14.	"City of Hunger"	2:17
15.	"There is Hope"	3:32
16.	"Carefree Days"	3:20
17.	"The High Seas"	2:08
18.	"Kingdom by the Sea"	3:23
19.	"Deep Sea Cave"	2:22
20.	"Fateful Encounter"	1:39
21.	"Painful Memories"	1:28
22.	"City of the Future"	1:46
23.	"The Factory Floor"	2:22
24.	"The Boundless Skies"	1:16
25.	"In the Kingdom of the Mice"	1:34
26.	"Kingmaker's Theme"	1:52
27.	"The Lost Kingdom"	2:13
28.	"Dark Rite"	1:55
29.	"The Final Showdown"	1:43
30.	"Evan's Kingdom"	2:47
31.	"Happily Ever After"	5:16
Total length:		69:25
