= Ni no Kuni: Cross Worlds =

- Developer: Netmarble Neo
- Publisher: Netmarble
- Series: Ni no Kuni
- Engine: Unreal Engine 4
- Platforms: Android, iOS, Windows
- Release: Android, iOS: SEA: June 10, 2021; WW: May 25, 2022; Windows: WW: May 25, 2022
- Genre: Role-playing
- Mode: Multiplayer

Ni no Kuni: Cross Worlds is a role-playing video game developed by Netmarble Neo and published by Netmarble. Following a 2021 mobile release in Southeast Asia, the game was released worldwide in May 2022 for Android, iOS, and Windows. Level-5 approached Netmarble to create an MMORPG based on its Ni no Kuni series. The developers sought to imitate the series atmosphere, building the game over three years based on guidelines by Level-5. Reviewers enjoyed the presentation but criticised the tedious and limited gameplay. It was a financial success, earning more than US$101 million in its first two weeks.

== Gameplay ==
Ni no Kuni: Cross Worlds follows a beta tester for a fictional virtual reality game called Soul Diver, which transports them to the world of Ni no Kuni. Within Soul Diver, they meet an AI character named Rania before a glitch crashes the game. The character awakens in a burning city where they save the Queen, who is revealed to be the parallel version of Rania. The world is based on the one from Dominion of the Dark Djinn and Wrath of the White Witch. The game features five character classes: Destroyer, Engineer, Rogue, Swordsman, and Witch. It also has two gameplay modes: Kingdom Mode is a cooperative multiplayer mode wherein players can explore the world with their Imajinn; (Note: In English, Imajinn creatures are known as Familiars.) and Team Arena is a competitive multiplayer mode where six players compete in two teams to collect the most Higgledies. (Note: Higgledies are small creatures first introduced in Ni no Kuni II: Revenant Kingdom (2018).)

== Development and release ==
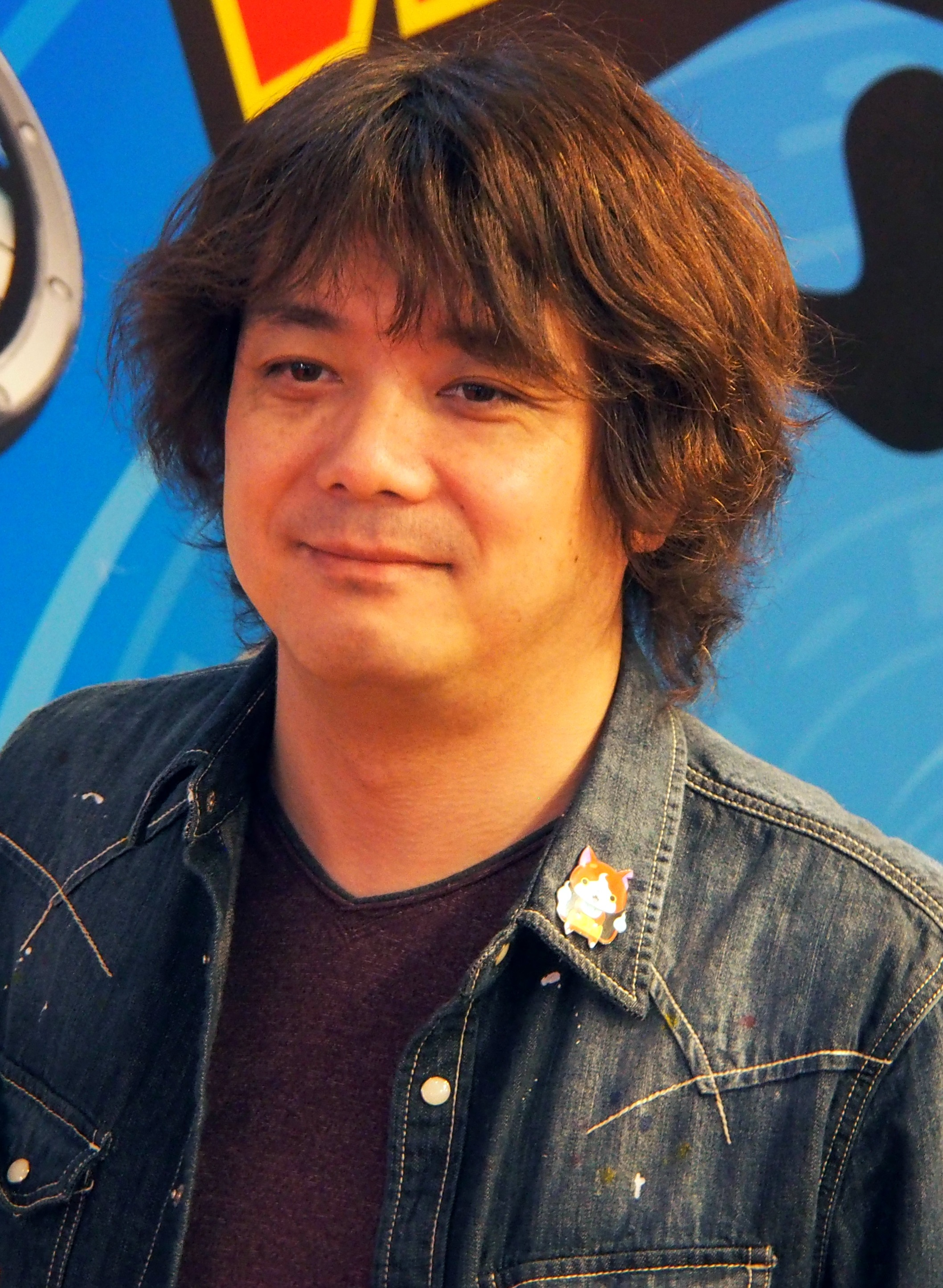
Level-5 president Akihiro Hino approached Netmarble with a proposal for an MMORPG based on Ni no Kuni in early 2018.

Ni no Kuni: Cross Worlds was developed by Netmarble Neo and published by Netmarble. Akihiro Hino, Level-5's president and chief executive officer, approached Netmarble in early 2018 with a proposal for an MMORPG based on Ni no Kuni, having been impressed with its previous game Lineage 2: Revolution (2016). Netmarble general producer Bum-jin Park felt the artistic style of the series would work well on mobile devices, though noted that it caused some trouble as the development team wanted to preserve its value. They also sought to imitate its atmosphere, including enemies who are not simply "evil" but whose actions are explained by their backstories. The game was developed independently by Netmarble based on initial guidelines presented by Level-5. Its three-year development involved core members of the team from Lineage 2: Revolution.

The game was revealed in November 2019 and pre-registration opened on April 14, 2021, before its free-to-play release for Android and iOS in Hong Kong, Japan, Macau, South Korea, and Taiwan on June 10, 2021, and globally for Android, iOS, and Windows on May 25, 2022. Cross Worlds was created using Unreal Engine 4. It introduced cryptocurrency and non-fungible token support in 2022, which led to community backlash for unbalancing gameplay. These features are set to be removed in September 2026 following the launch of a global unified server in July.

== Reception ==
Tommaso Pugliese of Multiplayer.it enjoyed the game's presentation but found the combat and controls complicated, lamenting the lack of controller support on mobile. Siliconera's Kazuma Hashimoto similarly felt the visuals and music "absolutely carry" the game but found its combat tedious and criticised the focus on monetisation. Rock Paper Shotgun's Danielle Lucas thought the game showed potential but was let down by its shallow, mobile-based gameplay that limited immersion.

Cross Worlds generated US$101.3 million in revenue in its first two weeks; it was the second highest-grossing game globally in that period behind Honor of Kings. Japan accounted for 45% of the revenue, while South Korea represented 35%, and Taiwan around 15.7%.
