= Ni no Kuni =

Video game series

- Series logo as seen in Ni no Kuni II: Revenant Kingdom
- Genre: Role-playing
- Developer: Level-5
- Publisher: Bandai Namco Entertainment: JP: Level-5
- Creator: Akihiro Hino
- Writer: Akihiro Hino
- Composer: Joe Hisaishi
- Platforms: Mobile phone; Nintendo DS; Nintendo Switch; PlayStation 3; PlayStation 4; Windows; Xbox One; Xbox Series X/S
- First release: Ni no Kuni: Dominion of the Dark Djinn; December 9, 2010
- Latest release: Ni no Kuni: Cross Worlds; June 10, 2021

Ni no Kuni (Note: Ni no Kuni (二ノ国; lit. Second Country)) is a series of role-playing video games developed and published in Japan by Level-5; Bandai Namco publishes the games outside Japan. The first games in the series chiefly follow the young Oliver, and his journey to another world to save his mother and stop the beckoning evil. The sequel follows Evan Pettiwhisker Tildrum, a boy king who is usurped from his castle, and sets out to reclaim his kingdom. The games utilize several magic elements, allowing players to use magical abilities during gameplay, and follow groups of characters travelling the fantasy world to put an end to its threats.

Conceived as a project for Level-5's tenth anniversary, the first game in the series, Ni no Kuni: Dominion of the Dark Djinn, was released in Japan in December 2010 for the Nintendo DS. An enhanced version of the game for the PlayStation 3, Ni no Kuni: Wrath of the White Witch, was released in Japan in November 2011; it was developed separately, retaining a similar story, but featuring significant artwork, graphics and specification changes. A localized version was published in Western regions by Namco Bandai Games in January 2013. A sequel, Ni no Kuni II: Revenant Kingdom, was released worldwide on the PlayStation 4 and Windows in March 2018. Three mobile games have also been produced: Hotroit Stories, released in 2010 through the Roid service, follows the story of Oliver and Mark as they try to find parts for a car; Daibouken Monsters, released in 2012 through the GREE service, is a social card game in which players collect cards; and Cross Worlds, released for Android and iOS in 2021 and Windows in 2022, follows a beta tester for a fictional virtual reality game, which transports them to the world of Ni no Kuni.

The animated sequences for Dominion of the Dark Djinn and Wrath of the White Witch were produced by Studio Ghibli, and the original score was composed by Joe Hisaishi and Rei Kondoh. The artwork was also greatly inspired by Studio Ghibli's other productions. The character development—particularly that of Oliver and his friends—was a large focus of development, and was intended to make children empathize with the characters and for adults to relive their adolescence. The developers chose to initially develop for the Nintendo DS due to its suitability for gameplay, and later used the power of the PlayStation 3 to its full potential to render the world with great detail.

Games in the series have been praised as being among the best modern role-playing games. Reviewers mostly aimed their praise at particular elements of the games: visual design, and its resemblance to Studio Ghibli's previous work; characters and story, for their believability and complexity; the soundtrack, and Hisaishi's ability to capture the essence of the game world; and the unique gameplay, particularly for its ability to blend formulas from other role-playing game franchises. The games also won awards from several gaming publications. In May 2018, Bandai Namco reported that the series had shipped 2.8 million copies worldwide. An animated film adaptation produced by OLM, Inc. and distributed by Warner Bros. was released in 2019.

== Games ==
Release timeline
2010	Dominion of the Dark Djinn Hotroit Stories
2011	Wrath of the White Witch
2012	Daibouken Monsters
2013
2014
2015
2016
2017
2018	II: Revenant Kingdom
2019
2020
2021	Cross Worlds

Ni no Kuni: Dominion of the Dark Djinn was released in Japan on December 9, 2010, for the Nintendo DS. After his mother dies, Oliver sets out on a journey to another world to save her. Alongside the fairy Shizuku, Oliver meets Maru and Jairo on the way, who assist him on journey. After retrieving three magical stones to complete a wand to defeat Jabou, Oliver discovers that he cannot save his mother, but vows to protect the world regardless. He defeats Jabou, who uses his power to ensure that Oliver does not die as well.

Ni no Kuni: Hotroit Stories (Note: 二ノ国 ホットロイトストーリー) was released in Japan on December 9, 2010, for mobile devices through the Roid service. It follows the story of Oliver and his friend Mark, who create a custom car by finding parts around Hotroit, eventually making their way to an abandoned factory and encountering creatures. Hotroit Stories does not feature magic; characters instead attack using items such as dry ice for similar effects.

Ni no Kuni: Wrath of the White Witch was released for the PlayStation 3 in Japan on November 17, 2011, and published in Western regions by Namco Bandai Games in January 2013. The game was released for the Nintendo Switch in September 2019; a remastered version was released for PlayStation 4 and Windows in September 2019, and for Xbox One and Xbox Series X/S in September 2022. The game is an enhanced version of Dominion of the Dark Djinn, with an extended ending. After Jabou / Shadar is defeated, the White Witch turns the citizens into undead-like creatures. After Oliver defeats her, she is restored to her former self and promises to make amends. Oliver returns to his old life in Motorville.

Ni no Kuni: Daibouken Monsters (Note: 二ノ国 大冒険モンスターズ) was released in Japan on May 11, 2012, for mobile devices through the GREE service. Players travel to another world and collect cards featuring imajinn. An occupant of the other world is trapped in every card; by flipping the card, players can use the occupant's abilities during battles. Rare cards grant powers such as improved recovery and special attacks. In a cooperative multiplayer mode, two players defend against a boss encounter in a "Raid" battle.

Ni no Kuni II: Revenant Kingdom was released for the PlayStation 4 and Windows on March 23, 2018, and for the Nintendo Switch on September 17, 2021; and for Xbox One and Xbox Series X/S in March 2023. The story follows King Evan Pettiwhisker Tildrum, who is usurped from his castle, and sets out to reclaim his kingdom. He is aided by Roland, a visitor from another world, and Tani, the daughter of a boss of air pirates.

Ni no Kuni: Cross Worlds was released for Android and iOS in Japan, South Korea, and Taiwan on June 10, 2021, and worldwide on May 25, 2022. Developed by Netmarble, the game follows a beta tester for a fictional virtual reality game called Soul Diver, which transports them to the world of Ni no Kuni. It includes five character classes, and well as a multiplayer kingdom feature with player versus player combat.

== Common elements ==
The battle mode in Wrath of the White Witch takes place on an open battlefield, allowing players to freely roam the area.

The series consists of five role-playing games and one social card game. Each game typically features a third-person camera. The player controls the player character in a combination of combat and puzzle game elements to achieve goals and complete the story. Hotroit Stories is the only installment to feature an overhead perspective, while Daibouken Monsters is played as a card game, with no character movement. All games in the series feature a battle mode. During battles, player command a single human ally. To fight enemies in the main game, players use magical abilities (Note: The four playable characters in Dominion of the Dark Djinn and Wrath of the White Witch possess differing abilities to use in battle: Oliver and Marcassin/Lars use wands to cast spells, Esther/Maru plays songs with a harp, and Swaine/Jairo uses trick shots.) or familiars; in Hotroit Stories, players attack using items such as dry ice for similar effects, while Daibouken Monsters limits players to using familiars only. The battle mode in Wrath of the White Witch and Revenant Kingdom is on an open battlefield, allowing players to freely roam around the area, while Dominion of the Dark Djinn employs a grid layout, whereby players can create formations to avoid attacks.

Like other role-playing games, the series have players complete quests, which are linear scenarios with set objectives, to progress through the story. Outside of quests, players can freely roam the open world, finding towns, dungeons, and other dangerous places scattered throughout. One of the core aspects of the games is the ability to travel between worlds; the majority of the games take place in a magical world, often referred to as the "other world", while part of the games take place in Oliver's hometown. Upon leaving a location, players enter the World Map, which can be navigated, or used to select a destination. The world may be fully explored from the beginning of the game without restrictions, although story progress unlocks more gameplay content and forms of transport to navigate the world. In the main games, players initially run to navigate the world, though later gain the ability to travel by boat; Wrath of the White Witch adds the ability to ride on the back of a dragon.

Familiars are fairy-like creatures that wander throughout the game world. They can be found in different shapes and forms and can be obtained after being defeated in battle. They can then be tamed, in order to be suitable to send out in battle to fight for players. Players command familiars, who generally have a range of magic and physical attacks. Familiars level up and evolve alongside the human characters; each have unique statistics and capabilities, and can be guided through their upgrades with treats and equipped with items. Familiars are not present in Revenant Kingdom; creatures known as Higgledies are used in combat with different spirits using special moves on enemies.

== Development ==
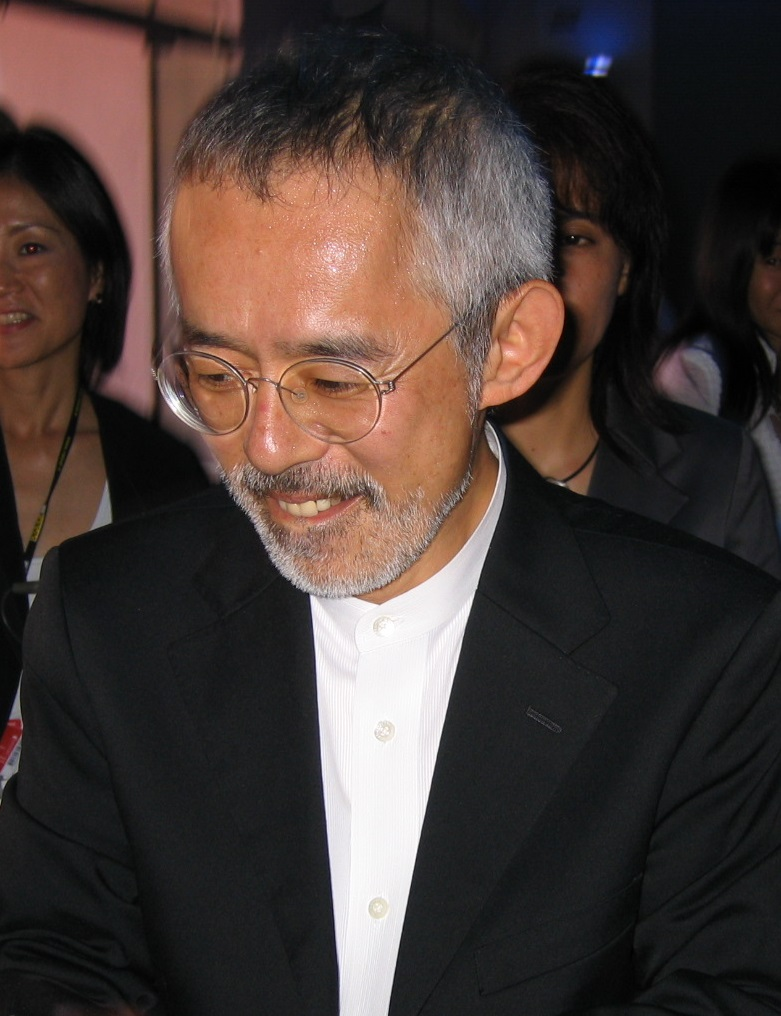
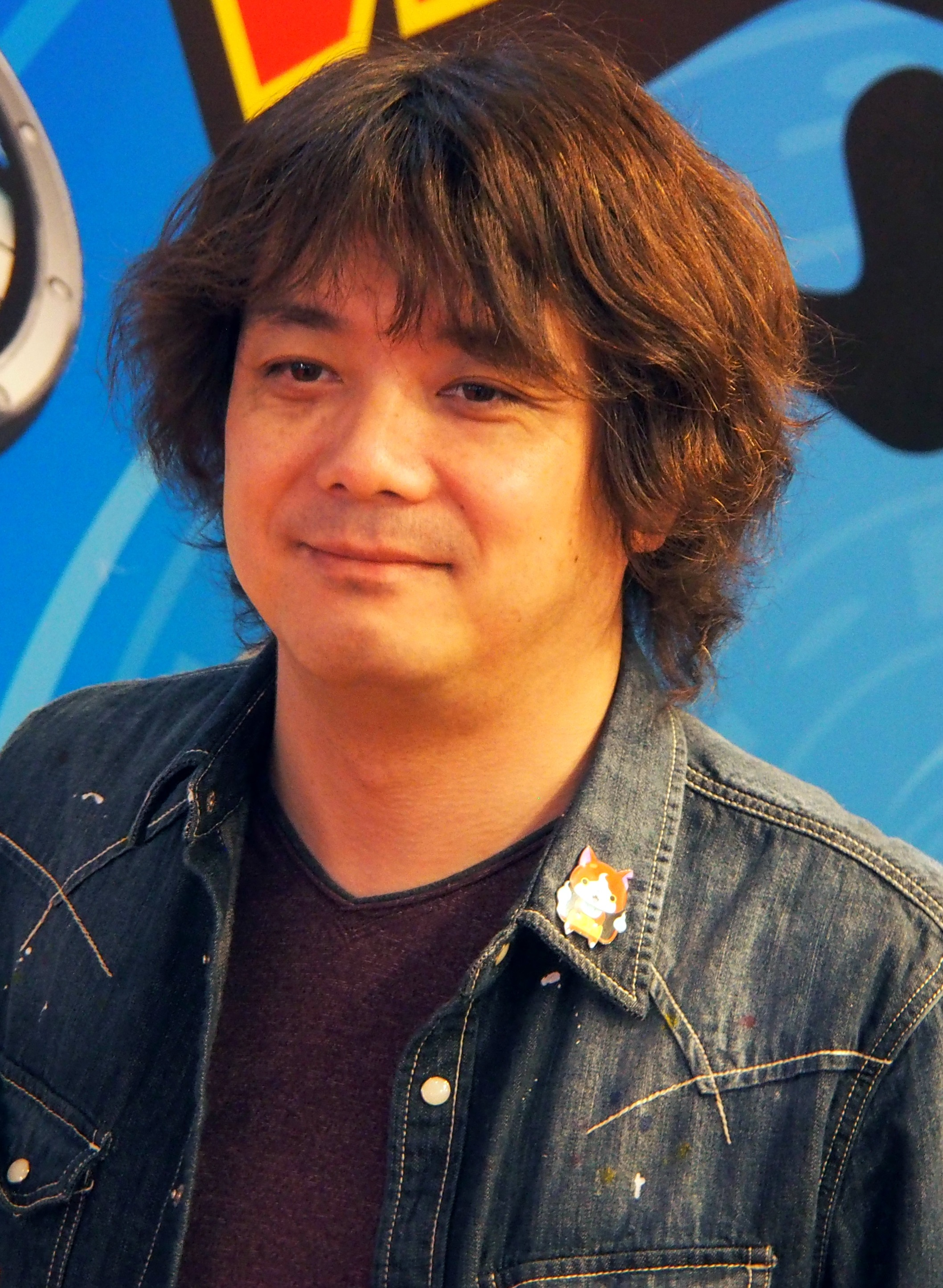
Studio Ghibli president Toshio Suzuki (left) agreed to collaborate with Level-5 after witnessing series creator and writer Akihiro Hino's (right) passion for the project.

Conceived as a project for Level-5's tenth anniversary, Ni no Kuni: The Another World was announced in the September 2008 issue of Famitsu, as a title for the Nintendo DS. In June 2010, Level-5 announced that the game would also be released for the PlayStation 3, with significant differences; the DS version was renamed Ni no Kuni: Dominion of the Dark Djinn, while the PlayStation 3 version was given the title Ni no Kuni: Wrath of the White Witch. Both versions were revealed to be in development separately, only retaining the same "story axle", while features such as artwork, graphics and specifications all received significant changes. Some character names were changed for the English version: Shizuku was changed to Drippy, Maru to Esther, Jairo to Swaine, Lars to Marcassin, and Jabou to Shadar, among others. Journalists noted that the game's announcement ignited widespread anticipation within the gaming industry.

Level-5 collaborated with Studio Ghibli to produce the game's animated sequences, and the game features graphics and visuals replicating the traditional animation style of Studio Ghibli films. The collaboration began when musician Naoya Fujimaki, who had previously worked with both companies, introduced Level-5 president Akihiro Hino to Studio Ghibli president Toshio Suzuki. At the time, Studio Ghibli had completed work on Ponyo (2008), and the animation team had no ongoing projects, which influenced Suzuki's decision to collaborate with Level-5. Another influencing factor of the collaboration was witnessing Hino's passion for the project. Studio Ghibli approached the production process in the same way that they would create an animated film. Work on the animation began in July 2008, and took much longer than the predicted three months.

Studio Ghibli's Yoshiyuki Momose served as the director of animation, drawing character designs and storyboards. Hino wished Dominion of the Dark Djinn and Wrath of the White Witch to have a heartwarming feel; the artwork and character movements was greatly inspired by Studio Ghibli's work, particularly due to their attention to detail, as well as their talent in creating storyboards and utilizing camera control. The development team constantly watched Studio Ghibli's films during development. The team wanted the theme of the game to resonate with children; they initially considered the idea of expressing adventure and dreams. They later explored the concept of a child's greatest influence, their mother, and the possibility of losing them. The game's main playable character, Oliver, is a 13-year-old boy. The team decided to make him a child as they wished to showcase a coming of age story. They wanted children to empathize with Oliver's development, and adults to relive the excitement of their adolescence.

Ni no Kuni: Hotroit Stories was teased at a press conference in June 2010 and the Tokyo Game Show in September before its formal reveal at the Level-5 Vision conference in October; the first and only chapter, titled "Oliver and Mark", was released alongside the launch of Dominion of the Dark Djinn on December 9, 2010. The developers found that the Nintendo DS was most suitable for Dominion of the Dark Djinn, while Wrath of the White Witch was developed for the PlayStation 3. The team planned to bring the game to the console from the beginning of development, but opted to work on the DS version of the game beforehand due to the larger number of DS users in Japan at the time. The team found they could render the game world with great detail, using the hardware to its full potential to present the animation, world and music. Hino felt that the PlayStation 3 version allowed the game's music to accompany the imagery, which was not possible on the DS version.

Following the Japanese launch of Wrath of the White Witch on November 17, 2011, Level-5 developed Daibouken Monsters. The team at GREE contacted Level-5 to create individual games for the platform, which developed into a comprehensive partnership between the two companies, resulting in Level-5 developing three games for GREE. Early registrations for Daibouken Monsters began on March 21, 2012, and it launched for mobile devices through the GREE service on May 11, 2012. The game was available for Android and iOS devices, through a membership with the GREE service. The cards were redesigned in June 2012, and the servers were terminated on September 28, 2012.

Level-5 worked with localization company Shloc to translate Wrath of the White Witch for Western regions; the two studios collaborated for many weeks. The team found great difficulty when localizing the game for Western regions, particularly due to the large amounts of text and audio that required translation. Other minor changes to the artwork and animation also occurred, such as making Oliver bow in a Western manner. By December 12, 2012, development on the localized version of Wrath of the White Witch stopped as the game was submitted for manufacturing. It was released in North America on January 22, 2013, in Australia on January 31, and in Europe on February 1. The game was released for the Nintendo Switch on September 20, 2019, alongside a remastered version for the PlayStation 4 and Windows, featuring enhanced graphical capabilities. The remastered version was released for Xbox One and Xbox Series X/S on September 15, 2022.

Ni no Kuni II: Revenant Kingdom was announced at PlayStation Experience on December 5, 2015. It was released for the PlayStation 4 and Windows on March 23, 2018, and for Nintendo Switch on September 17, 2021; it is scheduled to release for Xbox One and Xbox Series X/S on March 21, 2023. Studio Ghibli was not directly involved with development. Hino said that the game aimed to better fulfill the ambitions of the original game, with deeper stories and improved visuals. In June 2019, Hino stated that a third main instalment in the series was in development.

A third mobile game, titled Ni no Kuni: Cross Worlds, was released for Android and iOS in Japan, South Korea, and Taiwan on June 10, 2021, developed by Netmarble. Hino approached Netmarble in early 2018 with a proposal for an MMORPG based on Ni no Kuni, having been impressed with its previous game Lineage 2: Revolution. Netmarble general producer Bum-jin Park felt that the artistic style of the series would work well on mobile devices, though noted that it caused some trouble as the development team wanted to preserve its value. The game was developed independently by Netmarble based on initial guidelines presented by Level-5. Its three-year development involved core members of the team from Lineage 2: Revolution. The developers intend to release updates for the game every two weeks in response to player feedback.

=== Music ===
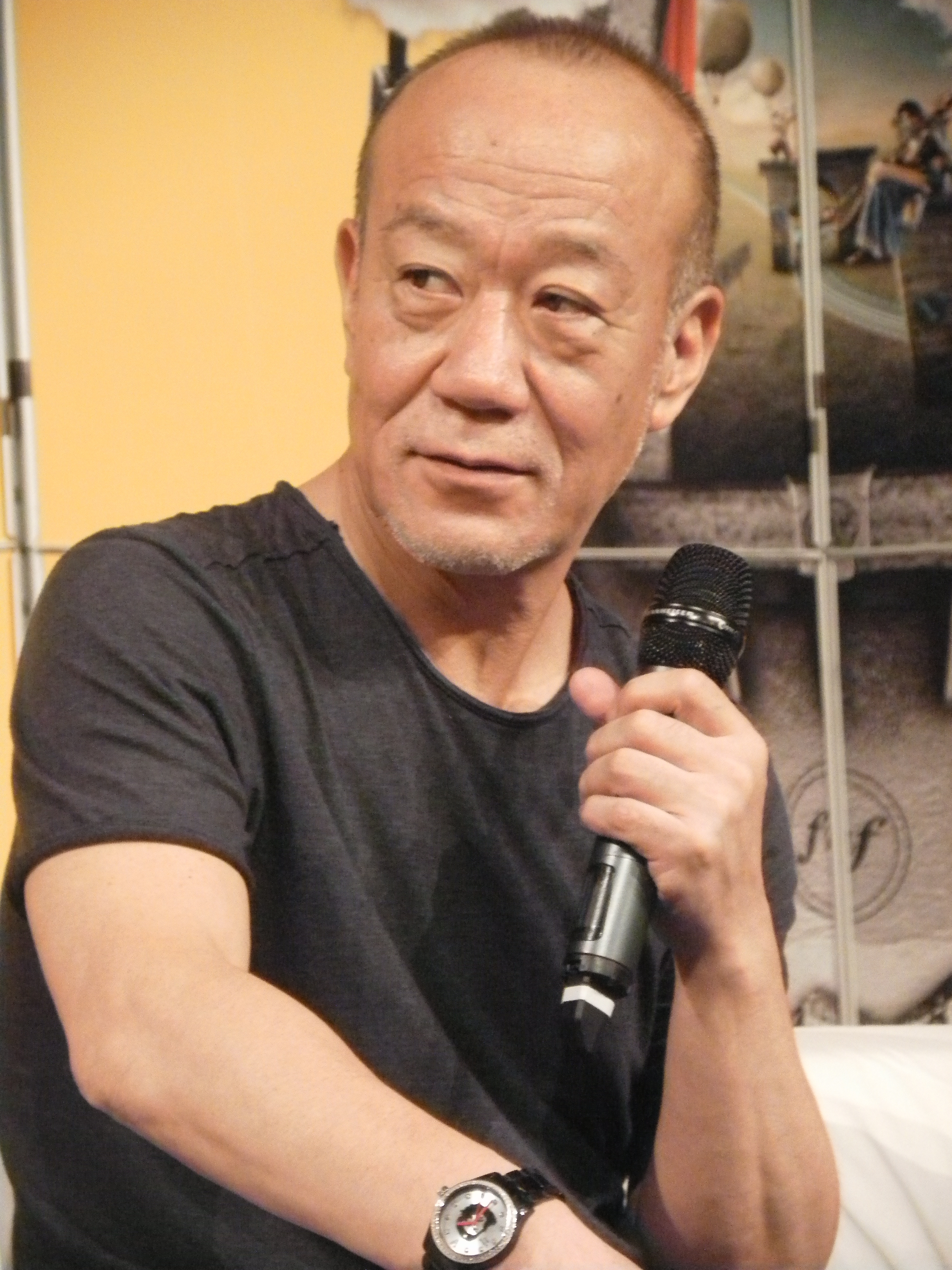
Japanese musician Joe Hisaishi, who previously worked on Studio Ghibli films, serves as lead composer for the series.

When Studio Ghibli agreed to produce the animated sequences of Ni no Kuni, they contacted Joe Hisaishi to work on the game's music. Hisaishi, who previously worked with Studio Ghibli on films such as Princess Mononoke (1997) and Spirited Away (2001), met with Hino. After witnessing Hino's passion for the project, Hisaishi agreed to work on the game's soundtrack. Rei Kondoh also created background music for the score, and all in-game music was performed by the Tokyo Philharmonic Orchestra. "Kokoro no Kakera", the theme song for Dominion of the Dark Djinn and Wrath of the White Witch, was written by Hisaishi; his daughter Mai Fujisawa performed the song in Japanese, while chorister Archie Buchanan performed the English version. The team found great difficulty in selecting a performer for the English version, though ultimately settled upon Buchanan due to his ability to convey the "vulnerability and innocence" of the game's characters in a "moving and powerful performance". For the orchestral music to fit onto the Nintendo DS at a high quality, Ni no Kuni: Dominion of the Dark Djinn was shipped on a 4-gigabit game card. Hisaishi also worked on the score for Ni no Kuni II: Revenant Kingdom.

Two Ni no Kuni soundtracks were commercially released. An album titled Ni no Kuni: Shikkoku no Madoushi Original Soundtrack was released in Japan on February 9, 2011, featuring music from Dominion of the Dark Djinn. A two-disc soundtrack was later released on March 28, 2013; the first disc is a re-release of the Japanese soundtrack, while the second disc contains additional tracks from Wrath of the White Witch.

== Film ==
An animated film adaptation, simply titled NiNoKuni, premiered in Japan on August 23, 2019, and was localized in English and released via Netflix on January 16, 2020. The film was directed by Yoshiyuki Momose, executive produced and written by Hino, composed by Hisaishi, produced by OLM, Inc., and distributed by Warner Bros. Japan.

== Reception ==
The series' artistic design received acclaim for its similarity to Studio Ghibli's previous work.

The first two main games were well received, with praise particularly directed at the visual design, characters and story, soundtrack, and unique gameplay. Dominion of the Dark Djinn scored 38/40 from Japanese publication Famitsu, who felt that the game's elements are effectively utilized to maintain excitement. Michael Baker of RPGamer named it the "best overall game" at the time, and Janelle Hindman of RPGLand wrote that the game is "a reminder of why people used to flock to the JRPG genre in the first place". Nintendo Gamer's Matthew Castle called it "one of the best experiences on DS". Wrath of the White Witch also received "generally favorable" reviews, according to Metacritic. Colin Moriarty of IGN named it "one of the best RPGs", and among the best PlayStation 3 exclusives, and Kevin VanOrd of GameSpot wrote that it joins "that elite group of games providing such an enticing world that you can't imagine never having visited".

The artistic design of Dominion of the Dark Djinn and Wrath of the White Witch received acclaim, being favorably compared to Studio Ghibli's previous work; Stephanie Bendixsen of Good Game called the art "vibrant and exciting", noting that it "brings the game to life in the most beautiful way". The story and characters were also well received, with IGN's Moriarty naming them among the game's standout features and Edge praising the believable and complex characters. Critics considered the games' music to be appropriate for gameplay; James Stephanie Sterling of Destructoid compared the soundtrack favorably to Dragon Quest VIII, and RPGLand's Hindman lauded the music as "gorgeously crafted". The gameplay and combat system polarized reviews; some reviewers found it a refreshing mix of styles from other role-playing games, with Joystiq's Sinan Kubba calling it a "triumph", while others noted its difficulty, and similarity to similar games.

The games received multiple nominations and awards from several gaming publications. Dominion of the Dark Djinn won the award for Future Division from the Japan Game Awards in 2009 and 2010, and the Excellence Award in 2011, and also awarded the Rookie Award from Famitsu in 2011. Wrath of the White Witch appeared on several year-end lists of the best role-playing games of 2013, receiving wins from Destructoid, Game Revolution, GameTrailers, IGN, the 18th Satellite Awards and the Spike VGX 2013 Awards. It also received Best Game from The Huffington Post, and Excellence in Animation at the SXSW Gaming Awards. At the 13th National Academy of Video Game Trade Reviewers Awards, it received multiple wins, including awards for Animation, Art Direction, Original Light Mix Score, Original Family Game, as well as Original/Adapted Song for "Kokoro no Kakera".

In May 2018, Namco Bandai reported that the series had collectively shipped 2.8 million copies worldwide, with Wrath of the White Witch shipping over 1.1 million copies and Revenant Kingdom shipping over 900,000. By the end of 2011, it was reported that Dominion of the Dark Djinn sold over 560,000 units; it was the 33rd best-selling game in Japan in 2010, and the 45th best-selling in 2011. Cross Worlds generated US$101.3 million in revenue in its first 11 days; it was the second highest-grossing game globally in that period.

== Bibliography ==
- Grossman, Howard (January 2013), Ni no Kuni: Wrath of the White Witch - Official Game Guide, United States of America: Prima Games
- 二ノ国 漆黒の魔導士 取扱説明書, Japan: Level-5, 2010
- Level-5, ed. (2013), Ni no Kuni: Wrath of the White Witch – Game Manual, United States of America: Namco Bandai Games
