= Music of Howl's Moving Castle =

Soundtrack of 2004 film Howl's Moving Castle

The music to Studio Ghibli's 2004 Japanese animated fantasy film Howl's Moving Castle (Japanese: ハウルの動く城, Hepburn: Hauru no Ugoku Shiro) directed by Hayao Miyazaki, featured a score composed by Joe Hisaishi, Miyazaki's regular collaborator and performed by the New Japan Philharmonic orchestra. Hisaishi had introduced several leitfmotifs for the first time, as his previous scores for the Miyazaki and Ghibli ventures did not have leitmotifs. But, the leitmotifs written for the film, led him space for experimenting the themes, and is different from that of Hollywood film music where "the leitmotif appears very clearly and is very easy to remember". His approach to the score was "a kind of international feel" where he could use sophisticated orchestration to reflect the dense orchestral styles associated in Hollywood films.

The image album to the film's music was released in January 2004, months ahead of the film's release and the score album was unveiled in conjunction with the film. A CD single of the film's theme, preceded the film's soundtrack. In 2020, the soundtracks of Howl's Moving Castle along with Spirited Away (2001), both were issued on vinyl LP, followed by a second re-issue along with the collection of Studio Ghibli soundtracks in 2023.

== Howl's Moving Castle: Symphony Suite ==
Howl's Moving Castle: Symphony Suite

Soundtrack album / image album by Joe Hisaishi
- Released: 21 January 2004
- Length: 48:44
- Labels: Studio Ghibli; Tokuma Japan Communications
- Producer: Joe Hisaishi

Joe Hisaishi chronology
| Le Mécano de la General (2004) | Howl's Moving Castle (2004) | Welcome to Dongmakgol (2005) |

Howl's Moving Castle: Symphony Suite is the image album to the film, that was released on 21 January 2004, several months ahead of the film's release. The album featured 10 instrumental pieces from the score, that had been re-arranged and orchestrated to include in the soundtrack. Those pieces were performed by the Czech Philharmonic that was conducted by Hisaishi and directed by Mario Klemens. Each pieces are titled on the elements and the characters from the film.

Track listing
| No. | Title | Length |
|---|---|---|
| 1. | "Mysterious World" (ミステリアス・ワールド, Misuteriasu wārudo) | 5:04 |
| 2. | "The Wizard of the Moving Castle" (動く城の魔法使い, Ugokushiro no mahōtsukai) | 5:56 |
| 3. | "Sophie's Tomorrow" (ソフィーの明日, Sofī no ashita) | 5:11 |
| 4. | "Boy" (ボーイ, Bōi) | 3:44 |
| 5. | "The Moving Castle" (動く城, Ugokushiro) | 3:56 |
| 6. | "War War War" (ウォー・ウォー・ウォー, U~ō u~ō u~ō) | 4:46 |
| 7. | "The Wizard's Waltz" (魔法使いのワルツ, Mahōtsukai no warutsu) | 5:39 |
| 8. | "Secret Garden" (シークレット・ガーデン, Shīkuretto gāden) | 3:24 |
| 9. | "Dawn's Allure" (暁の誘惑, Akatsuki no yūwaku) | 5:16 |
| 10. | "Cave of Mind" (ケイヴ・オブ・マインド, Keivu Obu maindo) | 5:48 |
| Total length: | | 48:44 |

== Howl's Moving Castle CD Maxi-Single ==
Howl's Moving Castle CD Maxi-Single

EP by Joe Hisaishi
- Released: 27 October 2004
- Length: 12:10
- Labels: Studio Ghibli; Tokuma Japan Communications
- Producer: Joe Hisaishi

Howl's Moving Castle CD Maxi-Single is the extended play released in CD on 27 October 2004. It featured the film's theme song, "The Promise of the World" (世界の約束,, "Sekainoyakusoku") performed by Chieko Baisho, who played Sophie in the Japanese version, and had lyrics written by Shuntarō Tanikawa and music by Youmi Kimura, with arrangements by Joe Hisaishi. It also featured a karaoke version of the song, and the unabridged orchestral version of the film's main theme "Merry-Go-Round of Life" (人生のメリーゴーランド, "Jinsei no merīgōrando").

| No. | Title | Lyrics | Music | Performer(s) | Length |
|---|---|---|---|---|---|
| 1. | "The Promise of the World" (世界の約束, Sekainoyakusoku) | Shuntarō Tanikawa | Youmi Kimura | Chieko Baisho | 4:22 |
| 2. | "Merry-Go-Round of Life (Instrumental)" (人生のメリーゴーランド (インストゥルメンタル), Jinsei no merīgōrando (insuto~urumentaru)) | | Joe Hisaishi | | 3:29 |
| 3. | "The Promise of the World (Karaoke)" (世界の約束(オリジナルカラオケ), Sekainoyakusoku (Orijinaru karaoke)) | | Youmi Kimura | | 4:19 |
| Total length: | | | | | 12:10 |

== Howl's Moving Castle Original Soundtrack ==
Howl's Moving Castle Original Soundtrack

Soundtrack album by Joe Hisaishi
- Released: 19 November 2004
- Recorded: 2004
- Length: 68:52
- Labels: Studio Ghibli; Tokuma Japan Communications
- Producer: Joe Hisaishi

Howl's Moving Castle Original Soundtrack is the soundtrack to the film published by Studio Ghibli Records and Tokuma Japan Communications, which released the album on 19 November 2004. It featured selections from Hisaishi's score performed by New Japan Philharmonic and the film's theme song "The Promise of the World" as the concluding track from the film.

| No. | Title | Lyrics | Music | Performer(s) | Length |
|---|---|---|---|---|---|
| 1. | "Opening Song – Merry-Go-Round of Life" (オープニング—人生のメリーゴーランド, Ōpuningu – jinsei no merīgōrando) | | | | 2:33 |
| 2. | "The Merry Light Cavalrymen" (陽気な軽騎兵, Yōkina kei kihei) | | | | 0:51 |
| 3. | "A Walk in the Skies" (空中散歩, Kūchū sanpo) | | | | 2:14 |
| 4. | "Heartbeat" (ときめき, Tokimeki) | | | | 0:20 |
| 5. | "Witch of the Waste" (荒地の魔女, Arechi no majo) | | | | 0:59 |
| 6. | "Sophie in Exile" (さすらいのソフィー, Sasurai no sofī) | | | | 4:19 |
| 7. | "The Magic Door" (魔法の扉, Mahō no tobira) | | | | 5:27 |
| 8. | "Irremovable Spell" (消えない呪い, Kienai noroi) | | | | 0:45 |
| 9. | "Cleaning House" (大掃除, Daisōji) | | | | 1:22 |
| 10. | "To Star Lake" (星の湖へ, Hoshinoumi e) | | | | 4:13 |
| 11. | "Unspoken Love" (静かな想い, Shizukana omoi) | | | | 0:27 |
| 12. | "In the Rain" (雨の中で, Ame no naka de) | | | | 1:28 |
| 13. | "Vanity and Friendship" (虚栄と友情, Kyoei to yūjō) | | | | 3:58 |
| 14. | "A Ninety-Year-Old Girl" (90歳の少女, 90-Sai no shōjo) | | | | 1:01 |
| 15. | "Saliman's Spell – Return to the Castle" (サリマンの魔方陣～城への帰還, Sariman no mahōjin ~-jō e no kikan) | | | | 5:22 |
| 16. | "The Secret Cave" (秘密の洞窟, Himitsu no dōkutsu) | | | | 2:33 |
| 17. | "Moving to a New House" (引越し, Hikkoshi) | | | | 3:05 |
| 18. | "The Flower Garden" (花園, Hanazono) | | | | 2:58 |
| 19. | "Run!" (走れ!, Hashire!) | | | | 0:57 |
| 20. | "You're in Love" (恋だね, Koida ne) | | | | 1:11 |
| 21. | "Family" (ファミリー, Famirī) | | | | 1:24 |
| 22. | "Love Under Fire" (戦火の恋, Senka no koi) | | | | 2:56 |
| 23. | "Escape" (脱出, Dasshutsu) | | | | 1:32 |
| 24. | "Sophie's Castle" (ソフィーの城, Sofī no shiro) | | | | 2:38 |
| 25. | "The Boy Who Swallowed a Star" (星をのんだ少年, Hoshi o nonda shōnen) | | | | 7:29 |
| 26. | "Ending Song – The Promise of the World – Merry-Go-Round of Life" (エンディング—世界の約束～人生のメリーゴーランド, Endingu – sekainoyakusoku ~ jinsei no merīgōrando) | Shuntarō Tanikawa | Youmi Kimura | Chieko Baisho | 6:50 |
| Total length: | | | | | 68:52 |

== FYC release ==
A For Your Consideration album featuring 8 tracks from the score, was published by the film's North American distributor Walt Disney Pictures' in the end of 2005, to coincide the forthcoming awards season.

| No. | Title | Length |
|---|---|---|
| 1. | "Merry-Go-Round Of Life" | 2:43 |
| 2. | "A Walk In The Skies" | 2:15 |
| 3. | "To Star Lake" | 4:13 |
| 4. | "A Ninety-Year-Old Girl" | 1:01 |
| 5. | "Suliman's Spell – Return To The Castle" | 5:23 |
| 6. | "Love Under Fire" | 2:56 |
| 7. | "Sophie's Castle" | 2:39 |
| 8. | "The Boy Who Swallowed A Star" | 7:30 |
| Total length: | | 28:40 |

== Reception ==
Glen Chapman of Den of Geek wrote "Hisaishi and the Japanese Philharmonic Orchestra combine here to brilliant effect, creating a beautiful, sweeping score that complements the movie perfectly". Sam Sewell-Peterson of The Film Magazine commented "Miyazaki's regular collaborator, Joe Hisaishi, scores the film, and the soundtrack is simple yet effective – he can bring a tear to your eye with a couple of well placed notes without fail. The score sounds a lot like a lullaby, and whilst it may have the power to send young children to sleep, it stirs entirely other emotions in adults – it causes you to reminisce, to remember happier times when the world was so much simpler." Sunah Ramsey of Collider wrote "If there is one thing this soundtrack has, it is energy. Just like Howl's slapdash nature, the melody picks the audience up and escapades them on a whimsical journey. The chirping flutes and waltz-like rhythm feel like sunshine on a spring day."

== Accolades ==
| Year | Award | Category | Recipients | Result | Ref. |
|---|---|---|---|---|---|
| 2005 | Tokyo Anime Award | Best Music | Joe Hisaishi | Won | |
| 2005 | Los Angeles Film Critics Association Awards | Best Music | Joe Hisaishi and Youmi Kimura | Won | |

== Sources ==
- Bellano, Marco (2010). "The Parts and the Whole. Audiovisual Strategies in the Cinema of Hayao Miyazaki and Joe Hisaishi". Animation Journal. 18. ISSN 1061-0308.
- Bellano, Marco (September 2012). "From Albums to Images: Studio Ghibli's Image Albums and their impact on audiovisual strategies" (PDF). Trans: Revista Transcultural de Música. 16. ISSN 1697-0101. Archived (PDF) from the original on 25 April 2018.
- Vincentelli, Elisabeth (12 August 2022). "The Composer Who Turns Hayao Miyazaki's Humane Touch Into Music". The New York Times. ISSN 0362-4331. Archived from the original on 15 August 2022.
