= Yoshiyuki Momose =

Japanese animator

- 百瀬 義行
- Born: November 29, 1953 (age 72); Tokyo, Japan
- Occupations: Animator, director
- Years active: 1980–present

Yoshiyuki Momose (Japanese: 百瀬 義行, Hepburn: Momose Yoshiyuki; born November 29, 1953) is a Japanese animator and director, who is known for his key animation work with Studio Ghibli.

== Career ==
Momose was recruited by Studio Ghibli in 1988 to provide layout and other duties for Grave of the Fireflies. He later provided key animations for Porco Rosso, Whisper of the Heart, and Spirited Away.

In 2004, Momose made his directorial debut on two short films, Portable Airport and Space Station No. 9. In 2005, while continuing to work at Ghibli, Momose formed his own studio, Studio Kajino.

In 2010, Momose served as a character designer, cutscene animation director and storyboard for Ni no Kuni: Dominion of the Dark Djinn, which was released on Nintendo DS. The enhanced version of the game was released a year later on PlayStation 3, titled Ni no Kuni: Wrath of the White Witch. Momose later character designed the game's sequel, Ni no Kuni II: Revenant Kingdom. In 2019, Momose directed NiNoKuni at OLM, Inc.

In 2021, it was announced that Momose will direct a film adaptation of A.F. Harrold's novel The Imaginary at Studio Ponoc. It premiered on December 15, 2023.

== Works ==
=== Film ===
Year	Title	Credit	Note
1988	Grave of the Fireflies	Storyboard, Assistant Animation Director, Layout	
1991	Only Yesterday	Storyboard	
1992	Porco Rosso	Key Animation	
1995	Whisper of the Heart	Key Animation	
1997	Princess Mononoke	CG Producer	
1999	My Neighbors the Yamadas	Storyboard, Unit Director, Scene Settings	
2001	Spirited Away	Key Animation	
2004	Portable Airport	Director, Screenplay	Short films for Capsule
2004	Space Station No. 9	Director, Screenplay	Short films for Capsule
2006	Tales from Earthsea	Key Animation	
2014	The Tale of the Princess Kaguya	Scene Design	
2017	Mary and the Witch's Flower	Key Animation	
2018	Modest Heroes	Director (Life Ain't Gonna Lose), Screenplay (Life Ain't Gonna Lose), Character Design (Life Ain't Gonna Lose), Animation Director (Life Ain't Gonna Lose)	Anthology film
2019	NiNoKuni	Director, Storyboard	
2023	The Imaginary	Director	

=== Video game ===
Year	Title	Credit	Note
2010	Ni no Kuni: Dominion of the Dark Djinn	Character Design, Cutscene Animation Director, Cutscene Storyboard	
2011	Ni no Kuni: Wrath of the White Witch	Character Design, Cutscene Animation Director, Cutscene Storyboard	
2018	Ni no Kuni II: Revenant Kingdom	Character Design	

== Bibliography ==
- Momose, Yoshiyuki (January 1, 2011). 百瀬義行 スタジオジブリワークス [Yoshiyuki Momose: Studio Ghibli Works] (in Japanese). Ichijinsha. ISBN 978-4-75801-208-9.
