= Mai Fujisawa =

Japanese musician

Mai Fujisawa 藤澤 麻衣
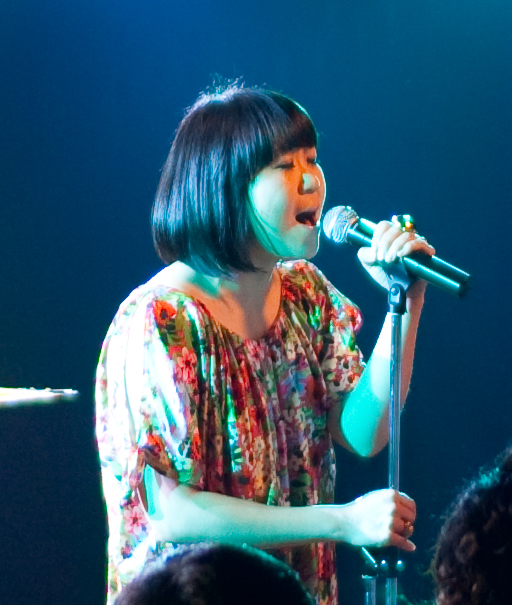
- Fujisawa in 2010

Background information
- Born: 1978 or 1979 (age 46–47); Tokyo, Japan
- Genres: Film score; classical
- Occupations: Singer; songwriter
- Years active: 1984–present
- Website: sing-mai.com

Mai Fujisawa (Japanese: 藤澤 麻衣, Hepburn: Fujisawa Mai; born 1978 or 1979) is a Japanese singer, songwriter, and lyricist. She has released four studio albums and has performed for several soundtracks. Fujisawa has collaborated on several occasions with her father, composer Joe Hisaishi, on the soundtracks for the films of Studio Ghibli. She has also performed on the soundtracks of other media, including the film Harry Potter and the Deathly Hallows – Part 2 (2011) and the video game Ni no Kuni: Wrath of the White Witch (2011).

== Biography ==
Fujisawa was born in Tokyo in 1978 or 1979, and is the daughter of Joe Hisaishi. At age four, Fujisawa performed "Nausicaä's Requiem", featured on the soundtrack of Nausicaä of the Valley of the Wind (1984) which was composed by Joe Hisaishi. Reflecting on the experience in 2019, she said that she "was always hoping" that she could perform in another Studio Ghibli film. While Fujisawa did not perform in another soundtrack until The Boy and the Heron (2023), she has recorded songs for the image albums – collections of demos and musical sketches that serve as a precursor to the finished score – for Princess Mononoke (1997) and Ponyo (2008).

Fujisawa studied at Seijo University in Tokyo, and later at Menlo College in Atherton, California. She founded the choir Little Carol, who perform for Japanese television and have toured internationally. She later began a solo career, releasing music that combines Japanese traditional and Western classical styles. She has also performed with Hisaishi on tour.

In 2012, Fujisawa was a guest singer on the United Nations Singers' Japan tour; she joined them again in 2015 for the United Nations' seventieth anniversary celebrations. Fujisawa is the goodwill ambassador of the city of Nakano. She has composed and performed theme songs for Nakano and Tochigi. She is also credited with writing the lyrics for the school song of Sakata Daichi Junior High in Sakata.

== Discography ==
Title	Released	Ref.
Mai (麻衣)	December 15, 2010	
Nursury Rhyme Songs (童謡うたう) (Note: Released under the name Utaumai (うたうまい))	May 22, 2013	
Raise the Sky (空みあげて)	April 8, 2015	
Beautiful Harmony (Note: Collaboration with Little Carol)	April 20, 2022	

== Performances in other media ==
Title	Title of media	Released	Ref.
"Nausicaä's Requiem" (uncredited)	Nausicaä of the Valley of the Wind	1984	
"The Town Where I Long to Stay"	Kiki's Delivery Service (vocal album)	1989	
"My Heart"	Kiki's Delivery Service (vocal album)	1989	
"Theme Song"	Welcome to Dongmakgol	2005	
"Rondo of the House of Sunflowers"	Ponyo (image album)	March 5, 2008	
"Stand Alone"	Clouds Above The Hill	December 18, 2009	
"Lily's Theme" (uncredited)	Harry Potter and the Deathly Hallows – Part 2	July 4, 2011	
"Pieces of a Broken Heart" (uncredited)	Ni no Kuni: Wrath of the White Witch	November 17, 2011	
"Theme Song"	Paper Lanterns	May 20, 2016	
—N/a	The Boy and the Heron	August 9, 2023	
