= Ni no Kuni: Dominion of the Dark Djinn =

2010 video game

- Developer: Level-5
- Publisher: Level-5
- Director: Ken Motomura
- Producer: Hiroyuki Watanabe
- Artist: Toshihiro Kuriaki
- Writer: Akihiro Hino
- Composers: Joe Hisaishi; Rei Kondoh
- Series: Ni no Kuni
- Platform: Nintendo DS
- Release: JP: December 9, 2010
- Genre: Role-playing
- Mode: Single-player

Ni no Kuni: Dominion of the Dark Djinn (Note: Ni no Kuni: Dominion of the Dark Djinn (二ノ国 漆黒の魔導士, Ni no Kuni: Shikkoku no Madōshi; lit. Second Country: The Jet-Black Mage)) is a role-playing video game developed and published by Level-5. It was released in Japan for the Nintendo DS on December 9, 2010. Players control Oliver, a young boy who sets out on a journey to save his mother. The game is played from a third-person perspective and its world is navigated on foot or by boat. While players navigate Oliver throughout the game's world, other characters can be controlled during battles against enemies; during these battles, players use magic abilities and creatures known as "imajinn", which can be captured and tamed.

Development of Dominion of the Dark Djinn began in 2008. The game's animated sequences were produced by Studio Ghibli, while the original score was co-composed by Joe Hisaishi. The artwork was also inspired by Studio Ghibli's other productions. The character development of Oliver was a large focus of the game, intending to make children empathize with the character and for adults to relive their adolescence. The developers chose to develop for the Nintendo DS due to its suitability for gameplay.

Following its announcement, Ni no Kuni was widely anticipated. It was acclaimed by reviewers, with praise particularly directed at its story, art style and music. An enhanced version of the game, titled Ni no Kuni: Wrath of the White Witch, was released in November 2011 for the PlayStation 3, featuring similar gameplay and story elements.

== Gameplay ==
Players control Oliver, Maru, Jairo and Shizuku during battles, with the ability to access imajinn.

Ni no Kuni: Dominion of the Dark Djinn is a role-playing game that uses a fixed third-person perspective. Players complete quests—linear scenarios with set objectives—to progress through the story. Outside of quests, players can freely roam the open world. Players explore towns, villages, dungeons and dangerous places scattered throughout the world, and possess the ability to travel between the world and Oliver's hometown of Hotroit. Upon leaving a location, players enter the World Map, which can be navigated, or used to select a destination. The world may be fully explored from the beginning of the game without restrictions, although story progress unlocks more gameplay content and forms of transport to navigate the world. (Note: Players initially run to navigate the world, though later gain the ability to travel by boat.)

When players encounter enemies, they enter a battle mode. The battles employ a grid layout, whereby players can create formations to avoid attacks, or lessen damage. During battles, players command a single human ally, or one of the "imajinn" accompanying them; changing primary command to a different human ally allows players to control their imajinn. To fight enemies, players use magical abilities (Note: The three playable characters possess differing abilities to use in battle: Oliver uses his wand to cast spells, Maru plays songs with a harp, and Jairo uses trick shots.) and imajinn. Imajinn are creatures that can be tamed, in order to be suitable to send out in battle to fight for players. Familiars level up and evolve alongside the human characters; each have unique statistics and capabilities, and can be guided through their upgrades with treats and equipped with items. When all enemies in a battle are defeated, players may receive experience points, currency and items. When a specific amount of experience is earned, characters' levels will increase, and their abilities improve. Should a party member lose health or mana points, they can be restored by using provisions.

The errands that can be undertaken at the request of townspeople and the bounty hunts available from the Taskmaster are collectively known as "tasks". When tasks are completed, players will earn a number of stamps for their current merit stamp card, which can be exchanged for upgrades. Players take part in battles using the Magic Master book, which contains various spells that are activated using drawings with the stylus. During battles, players can arrange their characters anywhere on the bottom screen to implement various tactics; for example, a character that can block certain attacks can be placed in front of others to shield them.

== Plot ==
Ni no Kuni follows the journey of Oliver, a resident of Hotroit. While trying out a new vehicle designed by his friend Mark, Oliver almost drowns, but is saved by his mother Allie; however, she immediately dies from heart problems after saving him. As Oliver cries, his tears cause his doll, a gift from his mother, to come to life and reveal itself as a fairy named Shizuku, who tells Oliver that he is from another world where an evil wizard named Jabou took control. He also tells Oliver that each person from his world has a "soulmate", a person that shares a link with someone in Oliver's world, and that his mother looks very much like a great sage, Alicia, who was captured by Jabou. Realizing that Alicia must have been Allie's soulmate, Oliver sets out with Shizuku to travel to the other world and rescue Alicia in the hope that doing so will bring Allie back in his world.

In the other world, Oliver finds a multitude of broken-hearted people affected by Jabou, and uses his new-found magic abilities to restore those pieces of heart which they lack, and travels the world to seek out the four great sages who may be able to help. Along the way, he meets Maru, daughter of one of the great sages, and Jairo, a thief who initially steals a crucial item from them, but who ultimately decides to help. As they enlist the sages' help, they learn of a wand that could be used to defeat Jabou, but are at a loss as to how to retrieve it, as it was recently destroyed by Jabou. Soon after, they find themselves many years in the past by the actions of a stranger, and are able to retrieve the wand there.

After returning to the present and retrieving three magical stones to complete the wand, Oliver learns that his mother Allie was in fact the great sage, Alicia. Realizing she could not defeat Jabou, and that he had destroyed his soulmate in the other world to avoid the possibility of being defeated through them, she chose to travel into both the future and into Oliver's world in the hopes of finding his next soulmate; after settling into this new world, she eventually gave birth to her son, Oliver, who unknowingly became Jabou's soulmate. After he is defeated, Jabou's past is shown. He was once a soldier who helped a young girl against orders, and whose hometown was destroyed to set an example. The spirit of Alicia talks to the dying Jabou, who realises that the girl he saved was the young Alicia herself. Jabou then uses his power to sever the link between himself and Oliver, in order to save Oliver from dying as well.

== Development ==
Conceived as a project for Level-5's tenth anniversary in 2008, Ni no Kuni: The Another World was announced in the September 2008 issue of Famitsu, as a title for the Nintendo DS. In June 2010, Level-5 announced that the game would also be released for the PlayStation 3, with significant differences; the DS version was renamed Ni no Kuni: Shikkoku no Madoushi, while the PlayStation 3 version was given the title Ni no Kuni: Shiroki Seihai no Joō, known in English as Dominion of the Dark Djinn and Wrath of the White Witch, respectively. Both versions were revealed to be in development separately, only retaining the same "story axle", while features such as artwork, graphics and specifications all received significant changes. Journalists noted that the game's announcement ignited widespread anticipation within the gaming industry.

The development team found that the Nintendo DS was best suited to the game's development. The team planned to bring the game to PlayStation 3 from the beginning of development, but opted to work on the DS version of the game beforehand due to the larger number of DS users in Japan at the time. Dominion of the Dark Djinn was bundled with a physical copy of the 352-page Magic Master book, containing information about mythology and instructions on casting spells; the book was digitised as the Wizard's Companion in Wrath of the White Witch, alongside a limited physical release.

=== Art design ===
Level-5 collaborated with Studio Ghibli to produce the game's animated sequences, and the game features graphics and visuals replicating the traditional animation style of Studio Ghibli films. The collaboration began when musician Naoya Fujimaki, who had previously worked with both companies, introduced Level-5 president Akihiro Hino to Studio Ghibli president Toshio Suzuki. At the time, Studio Ghibli had completed work on Ponyo (2008), and the animation team had no ongoing projects, which influenced Suzuki's decision to collaborate with Level-5. Another influencing factor of the collaboration was witnessing Hino's passion for the project. Studio Ghibli approached the production process in the same way that they would create an animated film. Work on the animation began in July 2008, and took much longer than the predicted three months.

Studio Ghibli's Yoshiyuki Momose served as the game's director of animation, staging the scenes and directing actors during the motion capture sessions. He was also assigned to drawing character designs and storyboards, incorporating a "Ghibli-like" style. Hino wished to incorporate the "heartwarming touch" of Studio Ghibli productions into the game; the artwork and character movements was greatly inspired by Studio Ghibli's work, particularly due to their attention to detail, as well as their talent in creating storyboards and utilizing camera control. The development team constantly watched Studio Ghibli's films during development. Game director Ken Motomura regularly worked with Studio Ghibli, swapping and reviewing assets, while Hino worked with the studio in regards to the game's dialogue and animated sequences. When designing the familiars, the team accounted for the characteristics of their surrounding area, which inspired the later design. Some of the initial familiar designs were deemed either creepy or "overly-cute", and adapted accordingly to match the style of Studio Ghibli's artwork.

=== Story and setting ===
The team wanted the theme of the game to resonate with children; they initially considered the idea of expressing adventure and dreams. They later explored the concept of a child's greatest influence, their mother, and the possibility of losing them. Although the framework of the story was completed prior to Studio Ghibli's involvement with the game, they still took part in many discussions regarding some ideas, including the game's final scenes.

The majority of the game takes place in a magical world, referred to as the "other world". To avoid making the world map feel outdated, the team modernized the design by arranging the terrain in "fun and fascinating ways". The game's open world was designed to remind players of a "miniature diorama", intending to invoke reminiscence to an older time, as well as the feeling of freshness. Other segments of the game are set in Oliver's fictional hometown of Hotroit. The town is modelled after an American town in the peak of the automotive industry during the 1950s and 1960s; this decision was made due to Oliver's interest in cars and machines.

=== Characters ===
The game's characters were particularly inspired by Level-5's previous work on the Professor Layton series (2007–present). During development, Momose suggested that the team design the clothes in a modern fashion, in order for players to gain a "stronger sense that you have stepped out of the familiar and into a different world". The game's main playable character, Oliver, is a 13-year-old boy. The team decided to make him a child as they wished to showcase a coming of age story. They wanted children to empathize with Oliver's development, and adults to relive the excitement of their adolescence. A major part of the story is Oliver's personal development, which Hino describes as "the process of how a child grows into an adult". In regards to Oliver's physical appearance, Momose made his outfit represent a young boy in 1950s America, which was the inspiration for his hometown.

== Reception ==
Reception

Review scores
Publication	Score
Edge	8/10
Famitsu	38/40
NGamer	84/100
RPGamer	5/5

Ni no Kuni: Dominion of the Dark Djinn received critical acclaim. Michael Baker of RPGamer named it the "best overall game" at the time, and Janelle Hindman of RPGLand wrote it is "a reminder of why people used to flock to the JRPG genre in the first place". Nintendo Gamer's Matthew Castle called it "one of the best experiences on DS". Famitsu editors felt the animation, music, and story were effectively utilized to maintain excitement. The game was awarded Future Division at the Japan Game Awards in 2009 and 2010, and the Excellence Award in 2011, and won the Rookie Award from Famitsu in 2011.

The game's artistic design received acclaim, being favorably compared to Studio Ghibli's previous work; Gigazine found the art style to be "Ghibl-ish". Famitsu praised the gimmicks in the design, similarly calling them "extremely Level-5 like". RPGamer's Baker felt that the graphics are the best in a Nintendo DS game, particularly praising the animated cutscenes. Nintendo Gamer's Castle echoed these remarks, calling it "visual perfection". RPGLand's Hindman called the graphics "beautiful and lovingly rendered", praising their effective use of building the world, and its lack of repetition. Chris Carter of Destructoid approved of the visuals, though found the graphics in Wrath of the White Witch to be far superior.

Reviewers praised the art within the game, particularly commending the work by Studio Ghibli, and Level-5's imitation of Studio Ghibli's art style. The layout and humor of the world was also well received.

The gameplay was met with positive reactions. Hindman of RPGLand found the battle system "fun", and admired the variety of styles present in battles. Baker of RPGamer praised the simplicity of the battles, but reprimanded the puzzles and level design for their lack of depth. Gigazine found the touchscreen controls "innovative" and unique, yet felt that the battle sequences were "not very thrilling" and lacking excitement. Warotan.com felt that game's combat was frustrating for the game's first half, until enough resources had been obtained. Edge found that the gameplay was too similar to other games, noting the collaboration with Studio Ghibli was the game's only unique point. The inclusion of the physical book with the game was also met with positive reactions; Famitsu called it "innovative", and RPGLand's Hindman praised the presentation, although criticized the constant necessity of the book for gameplay. Castle of Nintendo Gamer called the book a "genuine work of art", praising its relevance to the gameplay.

Reviewers commended the game's story and characters. RPGLand's Hindman appreciated the genuineness of the characters, and found that the script makes the game unique compared to other role-playing games. Edge favorably compared the characters to previous works by Level-5 and Studio Ghibli, the former for their ability to present believable worlds, and the latter for their presentation of "complex, adult problems from a child's perspective". Baker of RPGamer felt that the story is "comfortably cliché-ridden", noting that the writing "really shines" due to the characters. Tomomi Yamamura of Game Watch praised the game's voice acting, comparing it favorably to Studio Ghibli films. Conversely, Warotan.com found the story to be "flat", criticising the repetitive tasks.

Baker of RPGamer found the game's music to be "top-notch", noting its appropriation for gameplay. Patrick Gann of RPGFan called the soundtrack "beautiful", comparing it favorably to Koichi Sugiyama's work on the Dragon Quest series. RPGLand's Hindman lauded the music as "gorgeously crafted", appreciating the lack of electronic or synthesized songs, and Gigazine named it "magnificent". Nintendo Gamer's Castle lauded the music, favorably comparing it to film soundtracks.

=== Sales ===
Within three days of release, Ni no Kuni: Dominion of the Dark Djinn sold over 170,000 units, charting second for the week behind Monster Hunter Portable 3rd. Within one month, it had sold over 330,000 units, making it the 33rd best-selling game in Japan for 2010. By March 2011, over 500,000 units had been sold. By the end of 2011, sales figures had reached over 560,000 units; the additional 230,000 sold units sold in 2011 made it the 45th best-selling game of the year.

== See also ==
- Jinn

== Bibliography ==
- Grossman, Howard (January 2013), Ni no Kuni: Wrath of the White Witch – Official Game Guide, United States of America: Prima Games
- Level-5, ed. (2013), Ni no Kuni: Wrath of the White Witch – Game Manual, United States of America: Namco Bandai Games
- 二ノ国 漆黒の魔導士 取扱説明書, Japan: Level-5, 2010
