= Ni no Kuni: Wrath of the White Witch =

2011 video game

- European cover art
- Developer: Level-5 (Note: Remastered version developed by QLOC)
- Publisher: Namco Bandai Games: JP: Level-5
- Director: Ken Motomura
- Producer: Hiroyuki Watanabe
- Programmers: Yasuhiro Akasaka; Mamoru Itagaki; Yusuke Hashimoto
- Artist: Nobuyuki Yanai
- Writer: Akihiro Hino
- Composer: Joe Hisaishi
- Series: Ni no Kuni
- Platforms: PlayStation 3; Nintendo Switch; PlayStation 4; Windows; Xbox One; Xbox Series X/S
- Release: PlayStation 3: JP: November 17, 2011; NA: January 22, 2013; AU: January 31, 2013; EU: February 1, 2013; Switch, PS4, Windows: WW: September 20, 2019; Xbox One, Series X/S: WW: September 15, 2022
- Genre: Action role-playing
- Mode: Single-player

Ni no Kuni: Wrath of the White Witch (Note: Ni no Kuni: Wrath of the White Witch (二ノ国 白き聖灰の女王, Ni no Kuni: Shiroki Seihai no Joō; lit. Second Country: The Queen of White Sacred Ash)) is an action role-playing game, developed by Level-5. The game is a significantly enhanced version of Ni no Kuni: Dominion of the Dark Djinn, which originally released for the Nintendo DS in Japan in December 2010. It was released for the PlayStation 3 in Japan in November 2011, and published in Western regions by Namco Bandai Games in January 2013. It was also released for Nintendo Switch in September 2019. A remastered version was released for PlayStation 4 and Windows in September 2019, and for Xbox One and Xbox Series X/S in September 2022.

Players control Oliver, a young boy who sets out on a journey in search of a way to resurrect his recently deceased mother. The game is played from a third-person perspective and its world is navigated on foot, by boat, or on a dragon. While players navigate Oliver throughout the game's world, other characters can be controlled during battles against enemies; during these battles, players use magic abilities and creatures known as "familiars", which can be captured and tamed.

Development began in 2008, simultaneous with Dominion of the Dark Djinn. The game's animated sequences were produced by Studio Ghibli, while the original score was co-composed by Joe Hisaishi. The art style was also inspired by Studio Ghibli's other productions. The character development of Oliver was a large focus of the game, intending to make children empathize with the character and for adults to relive their adolescence. The developers used the power of the PlayStation 3 to its full potential to render the world with great detail not possible in Dominion of the Dark Djinn.

Following its announcement, Ni no Kuni was widely anticipated. It was acclaimed by many reviewers, with praise particularly directed at its story, graphic design and gameplay. Wrath of the White Witch became one of the best-selling PlayStation 3 games, selling over 170,000 units within a week of its Japanese release, and over one million units within fourteen months of its Western release. The game was nominated for and won awards from several gaming publications. A sequel, Ni no Kuni II: Revenant Kingdom, was released in March 2018.

== Gameplay ==
Ni no Kuni: Wrath of the White Witch is an action role-playing game that uses a third-person perspective. Players complete quests—linear scenarios with set objectives—to progress through the story. Outside of quests, players can freely roam the overworld. Players explore towns, villages, dungeons and dangerous places scattered throughout the world, and possess the ability to travel between the world and Oliver's hometown of Motorville. Upon leaving a location, players enter the World Map, which can be used to select a destination. The world may be fully explored from the beginning of the game without restrictions, although story progress unlocks more gameplay content and forms of transport to navigate the world: players initially run to navigate the world, though later gain the ability to travel by boat, or on the back of a dragon.

Players control Oliver, Esther and Swaine during battles, with the ability to access their familiars.

When players encounter enemies, they enter a battle system. Battles take place on an open battlefield, allowing players to freely roam around the area. During battles, players command a single human ally, or one of the familiars accompanying them; all characters and familiars are manually moved around the battlefield. The combat system is a hybrid of turn-based and real-time mechanics, similar to the active time battle system; each combatant has a timer, rather than a whole turn. To fight enemies, players use magical abilities (Note: The four playable characters possess differing abilities to use in battle: Oliver and Marcassin use wands to cast spells, Esther plays songs with a harp, and Swaine uses trick shots.) and "familiars".

Familiars are creatures that can be tamed, in order to be suitable to send out in battle to fight for players. Familiars level up and evolve alongside the human characters; each familiar has unique statistics and capabilities, and can be upgraded through the use of treats, and equipped with items. When all enemies in a battle are defeated, players may receive experience points, currency and items. When a specific amount of experience is earned, characters' levels will increase, and their abilities will improve. Health is lost when players are attacked by enemies, while mana points are depleted through the use of magic. Should a party member lose health or mana points, they can be restored by using provisions. Health and mana can also be restored by picking up orbs, known as "glims"; a golden glim restores all health, and enables the powerful "Miracle Move", which may deal significant damage to enemies or provide assistance to allies.

The errands that can be undertaken at the request of townspeople and the bounty hunts available from the Taskmaster are collectively known as "tasks". When tasks are completed, players will earn a number of stamps for their current merit stamp card, which can be exchanged for upgrades. The in-game Wizard's Companion book includes pages featuring Oliver's spells, as well as a bestiary, short stories, alchemy recipes and maps.

== Plot ==
Ni no Kuni follows the journey of Oliver, a resident of Motorville. While trying out a new vehicle designed by his friend Philip, Oliver almost drowns but is saved by his mother Allie who immediately after dies from heart problems. As Oliver cries, his tears cause his doll, a gift from his mother, to come to life and reveal itself as a fairy named Drippy, who tells Oliver that he is from another world where an evil wizard named Shadar took control. He also tells Oliver that each person from his world has a "soulmate", a person that shares a link with someone in Oliver's world, and that his mother looks very much like a great sage, Alicia, who was captured by Shadar. Realizing that Alicia must have been Allie's soulmate, Oliver sets out with Drippy to travel to the other world and rescue Alicia in the hope that doing so will bring Allie back in his world.

In the other world, Oliver finds a multitude of broken-hearted people affected by Shadar, and uses his new-found magic abilities to restore those pieces of heart which they lack, and travels the world to seek out the four great sages who may be able to help. Along the way, he meets Esther, daughter of one of the great sages, and Swaine, a thief who initially steals a crucial item from them but ultimately decides to help out. As they enlist the sages' help, they learn of a wand known as Mornstar that could be used to defeat Shadar, but are at a loss as to how to retrieve it as it was recently destroyed by Shadar. Soon after, they find themselves many years in the past by the actions of a stranger and are able to retrieve the wand there.

After returning to the present and retrieving three magical stones to complete the wand, Oliver learns that his mother Allie was in fact the great sage, Alicia. Realizing she could not defeat Shadar, and that he had destroyed his soulmate in the other world to avoid the possibility of being defeated through them, she chose to travel into both the future and into Oliver's world in the hopes of finding his next soulmate. After settling into this new world she eventually gave birth to her son Oliver, who unknowingly became Shadar's soulmate. After he is defeated, Shadar's past is shown. He was once a soldier who helped a young girl against orders and whose hometown was destroyed to set an example; a being known as the White Witch called to him to embrace his despair and become the Dark Djinn, Shadar. The spirit of Alicia talks to the dying Shadar who realizes that the girl he saved was the young Alicia herself. Shadar then uses his power to sever the link between himself and Oliver, to save Oliver from dying as well.

With Shadar defeated, Oliver prepares to return home but the White Witch appears and casts a spell known as "manna", an ash-like substance that turns all living beings in the three major cities into undead-like creatures. A girl named Pea, who has been appearing to Oliver on occasion, travels with the group and uses her magic to clear the cities of manna and restore the people to normal; the group proceeds to defeat the White Witch herself. They discover that she was a young queen called Cassiopeia from thousands of years ago who had noble intentions but was manipulated by her "council of twelve", calling themselves the Zodiarchs, who desired to run the country. Feeling powerless, she found and used the manna spell, believing it would bring peace and prosperity to her people. When the horrific effects of manna were revealed she gradually witnessed the death of all of her subjects, including the council, and found herself on her own. She was gradually driven to despair and became the White Witch, believing that all life must be destroyed in an attempt to "start over". Her power created an illusory version of the council to oversee the destruction of the world. The remains of her kind intentions also created Pea, the incarnation of her as a child, to help Oliver on his journey. Pea was sent to Motorville by the spirit of the Wizard King, Cassiopeia's father, to give Oliver his starting wand and teach him gateway so he could eventually save Cassiopeia/The White Witch from herself.

Having been defeated, Cassiopeia fuses together with Pea and is restored to her former, kind self. After assisting the group in destroying the Zodiarchy, the last manifestations of the council, Cassiopeia declares that she will dedicate her life to making amends for her actions and Oliver bids farewell to his friends before returning to his old life in Motorville.

== Development ==
Conceived as a project for Level-5's tenth anniversary in 2008, Ni no Kuni: The Another World was announced in the September 2008 issue of Famitsu, as a title for the Nintendo DS. In June 2010, Level-5 announced that the game would also be released for the PlayStation 3, with significant differences; the DS version was renamed Ni no Kuni: Shikkoku no Madoushi, while the PlayStation 3 version was given the title Ni no Kuni: Shiroki Seihai no Joō, known in English as Dominion of the Dark Djinn and Wrath of the White Witch, respectively. Both versions were revealed to be in development separately, only retaining the same "story axle", while features such as artwork, graphics and specifications all received significant changes. Journalists noted that the game's announcement ignited widespread anticipation within the gaming industry.

To spur pre-order game sales, Namco Bandai collaborated with several retail outlets to provide a special edition version of the game, with extra features and content. The "Wizard's Edition" includes a unique case packaging, the Wizard's Companion book, a Drippy plush doll, as well as exclusive downloadable content. The game was originally released in Japan on November 17, 2011, and in Western regions in early 2013: in North America on January 22, in Australia on January 31, and in Europe on February 1. At E3 2019, Bandai Namco announced that Wrath of the White Witch would be released for Nintendo Switch on September 20, 2019. A remastered version featuring some graphical improvements was released for PlayStation 4 and Windows on the same day, developed by QLOC. At Tokyo Game Show on September 15, 2022, Bandai Namco announced that the remastered version was available for Xbox One and Xbox Series X/S the same day.

=== Story and setting ===
The team wanted the theme of the game to resonate with children; they initially considered the idea of expressing adventure and dreams. They later explored the concept of a child's greatest influence, their mother, and the possibility of losing them. Although the framework of the story was completed prior to Studio Ghibli's involvement with the game, they still took part in many discussions regarding some ideas, including the game's final scenes.

The majority of the game takes place in a magical world, referred to as the "other world". To avoid making the world map feel outdated, the team modernized the design by arranging the terrain in "fun and fascinating ways". The game's open world was designed to remind players of a "miniature diorama", intending to invoke reminiscence to an older time, as well as the feeling of freshness. Other segments of the game are set in Oliver's fictional hometown of Motorville. The town is modelled after an American town in the peak of the automotive industry during the 1950s and 1960s; this decision was made due to Oliver's interest in cars and machines. Motorville is geographically based near the city of Detroit, Michigan; the Japanese version of the town was named "Hotroit".

=== Art design ===
Studio Ghibli's Yoshiyuki Momose designed storyboards for the game's animated sequences, incorporating a "Ghibli-like" style to the game.

Level-5 collaborated with Studio Ghibli to produce the game's animated sequences, and the game features graphics and visuals replicating the traditional animation style of Studio Ghibli films. The collaboration began when musician Naoya Fujimaki, who had previously worked with both companies, introduced Level-5 president Akihiro Hino to Studio Ghibli president Toshio Suzuki. At the time, Studio Ghibli had completed work on Ponyo (2008), and the animation team had no ongoing projects, which influenced Suzuki's decision to collaborate with Level-5. Another influencing factor of the collaboration was witnessing Hino's passion for the project. Studio Ghibli approached the production process in the same way that they would create an animated film. Work on the animation began in July 2008, and took much longer than the predicted three months.

Studio Ghibli's Yoshiyuki Momose served as the game's director of animation, staging the scenes and directing actors during the motion capture sessions. He was also assigned to drawing character designs and storyboards. Hino wished the game to have a heartwarming feel; the artwork and character movements was greatly inspired by Studio Ghibli's work, particularly due to their attention to detail, as well as their talent in creating storyboards and utilizing camera control. The development team constantly watched Studio Ghibli's films during development. Game director Ken Motomura regularly worked with Studio Ghibli, swapping and reviewing assets, while Hino worked with the studio in regards to the game's dialogue and animated sequences.

To make Studio Ghibli's hand-drawn cutscenes and the game engine's real-time cutscenes transition seamlessly, Level-5 adjusted the latter's color tones, shadows and character movements. For the backgrounds, the team used deep colors, unifying them so they would not look like "a mass of polygons". The team found particular difficulty in animating the game's cel shaded appearance, and spent time researching Studio Ghibli animation to recreate their traditional animation. When designing the familiars, Level-5 accounted for the characteristics of their surrounding area, which inspired the later design. Some of the initial familiar designs were deemed either creepy or "overly-cute", and adapted accordingly to match the style of Studio Ghibli's artwork.

=== Character development ===
For the game's characters, the team wished to explore the concept of opposites, mainly represented by the White Witch's goal to destroy the world, and Oliver's attempts to save it. The character performances were mostly recorded using motion capture technology, followed by manual adjustment by the team to make a "more anime-like movement". The game's characters were particularly inspired by Level-5's previous work on the Professor Layton series (2007–present). During development, Momose suggested that the team design the clothes in a modern fashion, in order for players to gain a "stronger sense that you have stepped out of the familiar and into a different world".

The game's main playable character, Oliver, is a 13-year-old boy. The team decided to make him a child as they wished to showcase a coming of age story. They wanted children to empathize with Oliver's development, and adults to relive the excitement of their adolescence. A major part of the story is Oliver's personal development, which Hino describes as "the process of how a child grows into an adult". In regards to Oliver's physical appearance, Momose made his outfit represent a young boy in 1950s America, which was the inspiration for his hometown.

For the localization of the game, the team decided to give the character of Drippy a Welsh accent, citing comedian Rhod Gilbert as a reference point. Steffan Rhodri was ultimately cast as Drippy; the team immediately felt that he fit the role, during his first audition. The Fairy Godmother character was initially conceived as an "older lady with a perm", which evolved into the concept of a "mountain-like woman". The method that she uses to give birth, in which the offspring burst forth, was inspired by the process that sea anemones lay eggs. The character of Cassiopeia was conceived in a quick meeting, after which the background information and story documents were handed to Momose, who drew the character based on the information. Cassiopeia underwent various changes throughout development. In particular, Momose suggested possible alterations to her physical appearance, such as the size of her head, and changing colors to reflect her emotions. The character Pea was named as a reference to the fairy tale The Princess and the Pea, while her Japanese name of Kokoru is a reference to the word "kokoro" (心, heart).

=== Technical and gameplay development ===
Ni no Kuni: Wrath of the White Witch was developed for the PlayStation 3. The team planned to bring the game to the console from the beginning of development, but opted to work on the DS version of the game beforehand due to the larger number of DS users in Japan at the time. The team found the PlayStation 3 allowed them to render the game world with great detail, using the hardware to its full potential to present the animation, world and music. Hino felt that the PlayStation 3 version allowed the game's music to accompany the imagery, which was not possible on the DS version. The team found particular technical difficulty in animating Oliver's cape, which was overcome by a combination of mathematical calculations and hand-drawn motions by the programmers and graphic artists, respectively.

The team considered utilizing the PlayStation Move controller for casting spells in the game, in a similar fashion to the use of the touchscreen in the DS version, though ultimately decided against it as it would limit the potential sales. The battle system was revised over ten times, in order to achieve something new and unique. For about a year of development, the battle system used a turn-based system, though this was ultimately changed when the team felt that it was not fun for players. The team eventually merged turn-based combat and action elements, popular in Japanese and Western regions, respectively, in order to appeal to both regions.

Level-5 worked with localization company Shloc to translate the game; the two studios collaborated for many weeks. The team found great difficulty when localizing the game for Western regions, particularly due to the large amounts of text and audio that required translation. Other minor changes to the artwork and animation also occurred, such as making Oliver bow in a Western manner. By December 12, 2012, development on the localized version of Wrath of the White Witch was completed and the game was submitted for manufacturing.

== Reception ==
Reception

Aggregate score
| Aggregator | Score |
|---|---|
| Metacritic | PS4: 86/100; PS3: 85/100; NS: 84/100; Win: 82/100 |

Review scores
| Publication | Score |
|---|---|
| Computer and Video Games | 9.3/10 |
| Destructoid | 9/10 |
| Eurogamer | 9/10 |
| Famitsu | 36/40 (Note: Famitsu's total score out of 40 is composed of four individual scores; Ni no Kuni received scores of 8, 9, 10, 9, totaling 36/40.) |
| Game Informer | 7/10 |
| GameSpot | 9/10 |
| GamesRadar+ | 4.5/5 |
| IGN | 9.4/10 |
| Polygon | 6.5/10 |
| VideoGamer.com | 9/10 |

Ni no Kuni: Wrath of the White Witch received "generally favorable" reviews, according to review aggregator Metacritic. Critics praised the visual design, characters, story, soundtrack, and combat system. Colin Moriarty of IGN named Ni no Kuni "one of the best RPGs", and among the best PlayStation 3 exclusives, and Kevin VanOrd of GameSpot wrote that it joins the group of greatest RPGs.

The game's artistic design received acclaim, being favorably compared to Studio Ghibli's previous work. Eurogamer's Oli Welsh wrote that the artists of Level-5 and Studio Ghibli have collaborated to make a game that belongs to both studios. Moriarty of IGN called the game "unquestionably gorgeous", surpassing the visuals of most other games. James Stephanie Sterling of Destructoid echoed these remarks, stating that "few titles can hope to come as close". GameSpot's VanOrd felt that the "cartoonish visuals are heightened by extraordinary visual details", contributing to the "sense of wonder" created by the game. Stephanie Bendixsen of Good Game called the art "vibrant and exciting", noting that it "brings the game to life in the most beautiful way".

Brittany Vincent of GamesRadar found the story poignant, and IGN's Moriarty named it one of the game's standout features. GameSpot's VanOrd felt that the game's themes and dialogue positively contributed to the story, appreciating the use of humor, and GameTrailers called the writing "top notch". Conversely, Joystiq's Sinan Kubba wrote that the story lacked the charm that the art style possessed, while Polygon's Philip Kollar felt that the game's art style was the only motive to complete the story, which he felt was predictable. Some reviewers commented on the pacing of the story; Eurogamer's Welsh found that it was "too slow to surprise or to develop its mysteries", while GamesRadar's Vincent found the pace believable. The game's side quests also received praise; GameTrailers felt that they provide insight into the world and Eurogamer's Welsh commended their variety, while Polygon's Kollar conversely found them uninteresting and "single-minded".

An artistic design of the game's main world. Reviewers praised the art within the game, particularly commending the work by Studio Ghibli. The layout and humor of the world was also well received.

The world and environments of the game drew acclaim from many reviewers. Electronic Gaming Monthly's Andrew Fitch named the world one of the game's standout features, praising the diversity of the locales. Jason Schreier of Kotaku praised the "care and precision" with which the world was crafted. Kimberley Wallace of Game Informer called the world "breathtaking", and Destructoid's Sterling felt that the world was "adorable", praising the design and use of the familiars.

The game's characters polarized reviewers. Some felt that the characters were inventive and interesting, while others noted that they lacked personality. Bendixsen of Good Game called the characters "imaginative and wacky", while IGN's Moriarty felt that Oliver's uniqueness was one of the standout points of the game, and found that it made him care about the character. Destructoid's Sterling disliked Oliver, but found that the supporting characters compensate. Wallace of Game Informer felt that the characters lack personality, and only exist to assist Oliver's journey. Joystiq's Kubba echoed similar remarks, stating that the characters have "the depth of a toothbrush". Similarly, the voice acting received mixed reactions; IGN's Moriarty felt that the English voice for Oliver was the most disappointing, but praised the other voice acting, and Ian Dransfield of VideoGamer.com wrote that the English dub is "worth hearing".

Many reviewers found the battle system a refreshing mix from other role-playing games. Fitch of Electronic Gaming Monthly commented that "it keeps getting better the longer you play". Joystiq's Kubba called the game's combat a "triumph", praising its ability to blend different styles, and GameTrailers found it "immensely satisfying". Kotaku's Schreier felt that the combat never feels unfair, although criticized the use of the artificial intelligence during the battle. Phil Iwaniuk of Official PlayStation Magazine found the game's consistent battle encounters irritating, but that combat is "otherwise a pleasure". Polygon's Kollar felt that the game's artificial intelligence resulted in a "sloppy" and "frustrating" combat system.

Reviewers praised the use of music in the game. IGN's Moriarty felt that it was appropriate in every situation, praising its ability to create emotion and involve players in the experience. GameTrailers found the soundtrack "powerful", commenting on its appropriate use during gameplay, and GamesRadar's Vincent named it "breathtaking". Sterling of Destructoid favorably compared the soundtrack to Dragon Quest VIII, praising the orchestral qualities and "sense of fun". Chris Scullion of Computer and Video Games wrote that the music ensures the game "sounds as good as it looks". Eurogamer's Welsh called the music "a lush and romantic treat", though criticized the repetitiveness of the battle music.

=== Sales ===
Within seven days of its original release in Japan, Ni no Kuni: Wrath of the White Witch sold over 170,000 units. Following its release in the United Kingdom, the game topped the charts, and sold out in many stores across the region. By March 2014, the game had shipped over 1.1 million copies worldwide, making it one of the best-selling PlayStation 3 games. Many pre-orders of the game's special edition, the "Wizard's Edition", were cancelled due to overselling as a result of a glitch in the order system. All canceled orders were compensated with a $20 clubNamco voucher and the game's strategy guide by Prima Games.

=== Awards ===
Ni no Kuni: Wrath of the White Witch received multiple nominations and awards from gaming publications. Prior to its release, it won Best RPG Game from Computer and Video Games. The game appeared on several year-end lists of the best role-playing games of 2013, receiving wins from Destructoid, Game Revolution, GameTrailers, IGN, the 18th Satellite Awards and VGX. It also received Best Game from The Huffington Post and Excellence in Animation at the SXSW Gaming Awards.

| Award | Date | Category | Result | Ref. |
|---|---|---|---|---|
| British Academy Video Games Awards | March 12, 2014 | Artistic Achievement | Nominated | |
| British Academy Video Games Awards | March 12, 2014 | Story | Nominated | |
| D.I.C.E. Awards | February 7, 2014 | Role-Playing/Massively Multiplayer Game of the Year | Nominated | |
| Game Developers Choice Awards | January 9, 2014 | Best Visual Art | Nominated | |
| Golden Joystick Awards | October 26, 2013 | Game of the Year | Nominated | |
| Golden Joystick Awards | October 26, 2013 | Best Newcomer | Nominated | |
| Golden Joystick Awards | October 26, 2013 | Best Visual Design | Nominated | |
| Inside Gaming Awards | December 4, 2013 | Best Art | Nominated | |
| International Film Music Critics Association Awards | February 23, 2012 | Best Original Score for a Video Game or Interactive Media | Nominated | |
| Satellite Awards | December 18, 2013 | Outstanding Role Playing Game | Won | |
| SXSW Gaming Awards | March 8, 2014 | Excellence in Animation | Won | |
| SXSW Gaming Awards | March 8, 2014 | Excellence in Art | Nominated | |
| SXSW Gaming Awards | March 8, 2014 | Excellence in Musical Score | Nominated | |
| VGX | December 7, 2013 | Best RPG | Won | |
| VGX | December 7, 2013 | Best Soundtrack | Nominated | |

== Sequel ==
Level-5 announced a sequel, titled Ni no Kuni II: Revenant Kingdom, during the PlayStation Experience event in December 2015. Set hundreds of years after Wrath of the White Witch, the game features a new cast of characters. Delayed twice prior to its launch, Revenant Kingdom was released for PlayStation 4 and Windows on March 23, 2018.
