= Prima Games =

Video game website

- Parent company: Gamurs (2022–present)
- Founded: 1990; 35 years ago
- Founder: Ben Dominitz
- Country of origin: United States
- Headquarters location: Shreveport, Louisiana, U.S.
- Publication types: Books
- Fiction genres: Video game strategy guides
- Official website: primagames.com

Prima Games is a website owned by Gamurs that covers video game news and tips. Founded in 1990, it was formerly a publishing company of print and digital strategy guides for video games. Random House acquired the company in 2001. In 2015, Prima Games merged with BradyGames, an imprint of DK, where it continued to operate under the Prima name. In 2019, DK announced that Prima Games would cease the production of strategy guides, later selling the company to Asteri Holdings the same year. Gamurs acquired Prima Games in 2022.

== History ==
Prima Publishing was a small publisher working out of a residential-style home office in Roseville, California, when in 1990, its owner, Ben Dominitz, contracted with author Rusel DeMaria to create a video game strategy guide imprint, initially called "The Secrets of the Games". At the time, DeMaria was senior editor for PC Games magazine and on the staff of GamePro. The initial contract called for five books: Nintendo Games Secrets, Sega Genesis Games Secrets, Turbografx Games Secrets, Game Boy Games Secrets, and The Official Lucasfilm Games Air Combat Strategies Book.

Notable titles included Myst: The Official Strategy Guide, which sold in excess of 1.25 million copies in all versions; The 7th Guest: The Official Strategy Guide; X-Wing: The Official Strategy Guide; TIE Fighter: The Official Strategy Guide; Secret of Mana Game Secrets; Prince of Persia: The Official Strategy Guide; a special Sonic the Hedgehog book for Sega; and two Earthworm Jim strategy guides. DeMaria served as the principal author and creative director of Secrets of the Games between 1990 and 1996. He also was the editor on several books by other authors.

Prima Games, originally an imprint of Prima Communications, was acquired along with its parent company by Random House in 2001. Four years later, Prima introduced electronic distribution of digital gaming guides, which Prima started selling on Steam in 2010.

Historically, the MMORPG strategy guides produced by Prima Games had largely consisted of charts of data, maps, and basic instructions but lacked expert strategy content. In 2006, Prima started working with well-known online gaming community The Syndicate to shift the focus of their strategy guides from data dumping to deep strategy. Examples of this can be seen in the LOTRO, Pirates of the Burning Seas, Vanguard, Warhammer Online, and other similar guides from 2006 to 2009. Prima Games expanded their partnership with The Syndicate in 2009 by having them write the guides from the ground up, taking over the roles of writer, author, project management, and editor. Along with this shift, the scope of the guides they worked on was expanded from just MMOs to include FPS, RTS, and RPG games.

Prima entered a partnership with Nintendo in 2007 and created several official game guides over the years, such as for Super Mario Galaxy, Super Mario Galaxy 2, and Super Mario Odyssey. These guides contained gameplay tips, walkthroughs, canon lore, and sometimes never-before-seen concept art. Prima has also worked with other developers directly to create guides like Half-Life 2: Raising the Bar.

In 2013, Prima's parent company Random House merged with Penguin Group, owner of competing strategy guide imprint BradyGames, to form Penguin Random House. On June 1, 2015, it was announced that the two imprints would merge and continue to operate solely under the Prima Games brand. Penguin Random House announced in November 2018 that it would close Prima Games by Q2 2019. Asteri Holdings acquired Prima Games on March 14, 2019, and shut down the print operations, shifting focus to gaming tips on the Prima Games website and expanding into gaming news. The previously published digital strategy guides were migrated to a new system, but they were taken down in November 2024 due to the site falling out of use. The company was acquired by Gamurs in January 2022.
