= Joe Hisaishi =

Japanese composer (born 1950)

- 久石 譲
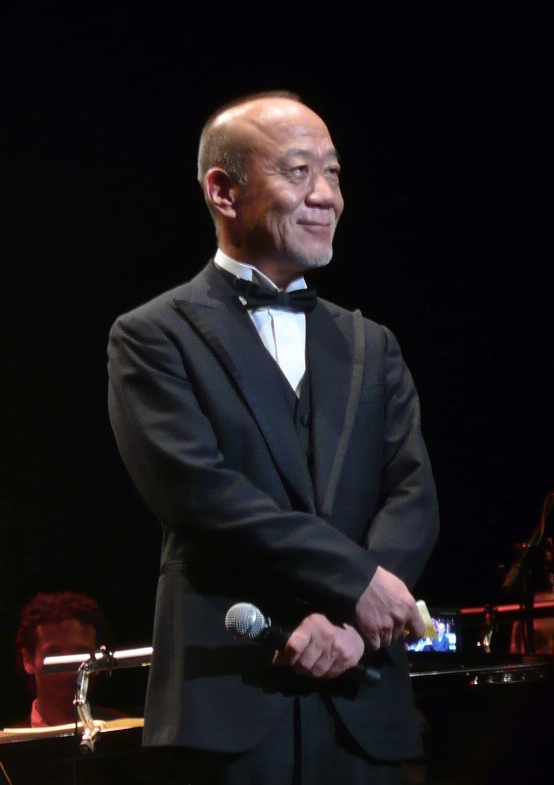
- Hisaishi in 2011
- Born: Mamoru Fujisawa; December 6, 1950 (age 75); Nakano, Nagano, Japan
- Education: Kunitachi College of Music
- Children: Mai Fujisawa
- Musical career
- Genres: Film score; classical; contemporary classical
- Occupations: Composer; conductor; arranger
- Instruments: Piano; keyboards; violin
- Years active: 1974–present
- Label: Deutsche Grammophon/Universal Classics

Mamoru Fujisawa (Japanese: 藤澤 守, Hepburn: Fujisawa Mamoru; born December 6, 1950), known professionally as Joe Hisaishi (久石 譲, Hisaishi Jō), is a Japanese composer, musical director, conductor and pianist, known for over 100 film scores and solo albums dating back to 1981. Hisaishi's music has been known to explore and incorporate different genres, including minimalist, experimental electronic, Western classical, and Japanese classical. He has also worked as a music engraver and arranger.

He has been associated with director and animator Hayao Miyazaki since 1984, having written scores for all but one of Miyazaki's films. He is also recognized for his music for filmmaker 'Beat' Takeshi Kitano, including A Scene at the Sea (1991), Sonatine (1993), Kids Return (1996), Hana-bi (1997), Kikujiro (1999), Brother (2000), and Dolls (2002), and for the video game series Ni no Kuni. He composed the score for the Oscar-winning film Departures (2008). He was a student of anime composer Takeo Watanabe.

== Life and career ==
=== Early life ===
Hisaishi was born in Nakano, Nagano, Japan, as Mamoru Fujisawa (藤澤 守, Fujisawa Mamoru). He started learning the violin at the age of four using the Suzuki method, and began watching hundreds of movies each year with his father. He attended the Kunitachi College of Music in 1969, where he majored in music composition.

In 1974, Hisaishi wrote music for the anime series Gyatoruzu, and composed some of his other early works, under his given name. He also composed for Sasuga no Sarutobi (Academy of Ninja) and Futari Daka (A Full Throttle).

In the 1970s, Hisaishi's compositions were influenced by Japanese popular music, electronic music and New Age music, and by the Japanese electronic band Yellow Magic Orchestra. He developed his music from minimalist ideas and expanded toward orchestral work. Around 1975, he presented his first public performance. His first album, MKWAJU, was released in 1981; his second, the electropop-minimalist Information, was released a year later. His first major anime scores were for Hajime Ningen Gyatoruz (1974) and Robokko Beeton (1976).

As he became better known, Hisaishi formulated an alias inspired by American musician and composer Quincy Jones: the same kanji in "Hisaishi" can also be pronounced "Kuishi," which is close to the way "Quincy" is transliterated into Japanese as "Kuinshī"; and "Joe" came from "Jones".

=== Anime film music ===
In 1983, Hisaishi was recommended by Tokuma, who had published Information, to create an image album for Hayao Miyazaki's animated film Nausicaä of the Valley of the Wind. It was the first of many of Miyazaki's films Hisaishi would score. Their collaboration has been compared to that of director Steven Spielberg and composer John Williams.

In 1985, Hisaishi founded his own recording studio, Wonder Station. In 1986, he scored Laputa: Castle in the Sky for Miyazaki's newly established Studio Ghibli; then in the 1990s, scored the Ghibli films Porco Rosso and Princess Mononoke. Hisaishi's compositions (including eight theatrical films and one OVA) become well known as a style associated with early anime. He also composed for such TV and movie hits as Sasuga no Sarutobi, Two Down Full Base, Tonde Mon Pe and the anime Tekuno porisu 21C (all 1982), Oz no mahōtsukai (1982), Sasuraiger (1983), Futari Taka (1984), and Honō no Alpen Rose (1985). He also scored the sci-fi adventure series Mospeada (1983). Other films he scored included, Birth (Bāsu) (1984), Arion (1986), Robot Carnival (1987), My Neighbor Totoro (1988), Crest of the Royal Family (1988), Venus Wars (1989), Kiki's Delivery Service (1989) and Ocean Heaven (2010). He also did theme-song arrangements and composed other anime opening, closing, and insert title theme songs such as Mahō Shōjo Lalabel (1980), Hello! Sandybell (1981), Meiken Jolie (1981), Voltron (1981), Ai Shite Knight (1983), Creamy Mami, the Magic Angel: Curtain Call (1986), and Kimagure Orange Road: The Movie (1988).

Hisaishi also developed a solo music production career. In 1989, he released his first solo album, Pretender, through his new Wonder Land Inc. label.

=== 1998–2004 ===
In 1998, Hisaishi provided the soundtrack to the 1998 Winter Paralympics. The next year, he composed the music for the third installment of The Universe Within (NHKスペシャル 驚異の小宇宙 人体III 遺伝子, NHK Supesharu Kyōi no Shōuchū Jintai III Idenshi), a series of popular animated educational films about the human body produced by NHK and the score for the Takeshi Kitano film Kikujiro, whose title track Summer became one of his most recognized compositions.

In 2001, Hisaishi produced music for another Kitano film, Brother, and Hayao Miyazaki's animated film Spirited Away. The opening theme to this film, One Summer's Day, had great popularity, with over 109 million Spotify streams as of April 2026. He also executive-produced the Night Fantasia 4 Movement at the Japan Expo in Fukushima 2001. On October 6, he debuted as a film director in Quartet, having also written its music and script; it received excellent reviews at the Montreal World Film Festival. His first soundtrack for a foreign film, Le Petit Poucet, was released the same year.

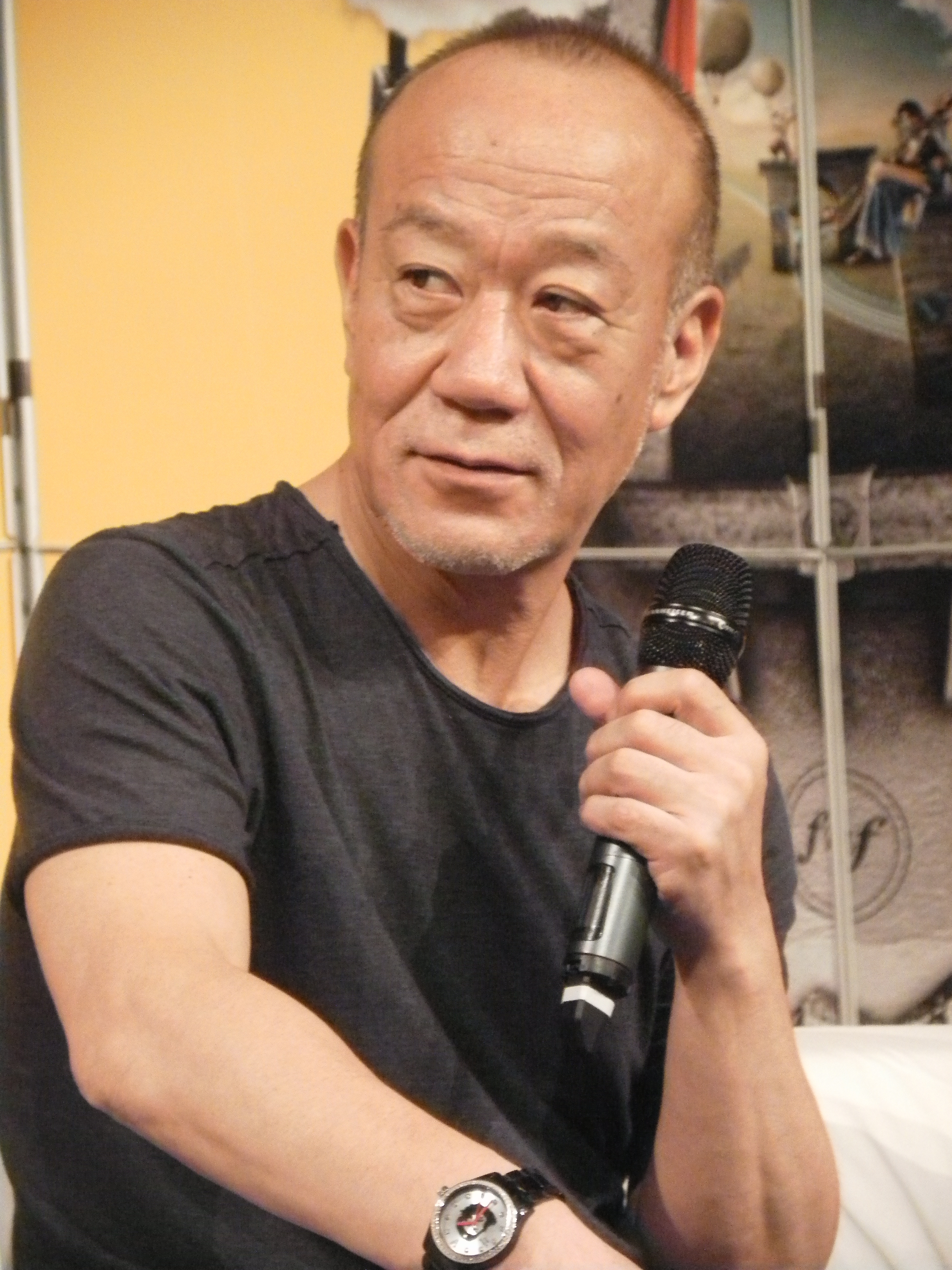
Hisaishi in Kraków, 2011

Miyazaki film Howl's Moving Castle was released on November 20, 2004, in Japan. Its main theme, Merry-Go-Round, became Hisaishi's most commercially successful movie score, with over 158 million Spotify streams as of May 2026. From November 3 to 29, 2004, Hisaishi embarked on his "Joe Hisaishi Freedom – Piano Stories 2004" tour with Canadian musicians. In 2005, he composed the soundtrack for the South Korean film Welcome to Dongmakgol (웰컴 투 동막골), and participated MBC drama series The Legend (태왕사신기 "The Story of the First King's Four Gods"), released in 2007.

=== 2006–2013 ===
In 2006, Hisaishi released his studio album Asian X.T.C., characterized by a significantly eclectic and contemporary Eastern style. Zhan Li Jun, the erhu player of the Chinese band 12 Girls Band, featured music from the album in a live concert. The next year, Hisaishi composed and recorded the soundtrack for Frederic Lepage's film Sunny and the Elephant, and for Miyazaki's film Ponyo on the Cliff by the Sea (both released in 2008), and the score for Jiang Wen's film The Sun Also Rises (太阳照常升起).

In 2008, Hisaishi composed soundtracks for the Academy Award-winning film Departures. He also scored I'd Rather Be a Shellfish (私は貝になりたい, Watashi wa Kai ni Naritai), a post-World War II war-crime trial drama, based on the 1959 Tetsutaro Kato novel and film currently being remade and directed by Katsuo Fukuzawa, starring Masahiro Nakai and Yukie Nakama.

In August 2008, he arranged, performed in, conducted, and played piano in a concert with the World Dream Symphony Orchestra to observe his 25 years of collaboration with director Hayao Miyazaki. Featuring over 1200 musicians, it sold out the world-famous Budokan.

In 2009, Hisaishi released a solo album featuring tracks from Shellfish and Departures. In 2010, he became an invited professor at the Japanese National College of Music.

In 2013, he composed the score for the NHK wildlife documentary Legends of the Deep: Giant Squid (世界初撮影! 深海の超巨大イカ), narrated by David Attenborough, for BBC's Natural World special Giant Squid: Filming the Impossible.

On June 28, 2013, Hisaishi was among those invited to join the Academy of Motion Picture Arts and Sciences, recognizing people "who have distinguished themselves by their contributions to theatrical motion pictures."

=== 2016–2019 ===
In 2016, Hisaishi was appointed art director of the Nagano City Art Museum. In 2017, he gave three concerts in Paris, similar to his 25-year Ghibli collaboration anniversary concert, performed in the Palais des Congrès de Paris. In May 2018, Hisaishi performed five sold-out concerts in his North American debut in California, US, at the San Jose Center for the Performing Arts with Symphony Silicon Valley. He also wrote the soundtrack for the TBS Nichiyō Gekijō drama In This Corner of the World.

=== 2020–present ===
On February 21, 2020, the album Dream Songs: The Essential Joe Hisaishi was released through Decca Gold, featuring 28 compositions from Hisaishi's career.

On February 19, 2021, the film Soul Snatcher (赤狐书生)'s soundtrack album Red Fox Scholar (Original Soundtrack) was digitally released, with 34 compositions ranging from 25 seconds to nearly five minutes in length. In 2022, Hisaishi worked on the Royal Shakespeare Company theatre production of My Neighbour Totoro. On March 30, 2023, Hisaishi signed an exclusive recording agreement with Deutsche Grammophon. Hisaishi composed the soundtrack for the film Silent Love, released on January 26, 2024. In 2025, Hisaishi composed the soundtrack for A Big Bold Beautiful Journey, his first Western film soundtrack.

In September 2024, Hisaishi conducted three sold-out concerts with the San Francisco Symphony at Davies Symphony Hall, performing "Music from the Studio Ghibli Films of Hayao Miyazaki." In May 2026, Hisaishi led a program with the National Symphony Orchestra at the Kennedy Center that sold at 95 percent capacity during a difficult season for the Orchestra.

== Awards and recognition ==
Hisaishi has won numerous awards, including seven Japanese Academy Awards for Best Music (1992, 1993, 1994, 1999, 2000, 2009, and 2011); the Newcomer Award from the Ministry of Education (Public Entertainment Section) (1997); the Art Choice Award for New Artist (Popular Performing Arts Division) (1998); the Los Angeles Film Critics Association Award Music Prize for Howl's Moving Castle (2005); and the International Film Music Critics Association Award for Television Division Best Original Score Award (for the South Korean drama Queen Shikigami) (2008).

In November 2009, he received the Medal of Honor with Purple Ribbon from the Government of Japan.

In November 2023, he received the Order of the Rising Sun, 4th Class, Gold Rays with Rosette.

Hisaishi was nominated for the Golden Globe Award for Best Original Score for The Boy and the Heron (2023).

In 2024, Hisaishi was awarded the Winsor McCay Award at that year's Annie Awards in recognition of his "unparalleled achievement and exceptional contributions to animation".

== Selected discography ==
- Nausicaä of the Valley of the Wind (1984)
- Laputa: Castle in the Sky (1986)
- My Neighbor Totoro (1988)
- Kiki's Delivery Service (1989)
- A Scene at the Sea (1991)
- Porco Rosso (1992)
- Sonatine (1993)
- Kids Return (1996)
- Princess Mononoke (1997)
- Hana-bi (1997)
- Kikujiro (1999)
- Brother (2000)
- Spirited Away (2001)
- Dolls (2002)
- Howl's Moving Castle (2004)
- Ponyo (2008)
- Departures (2008)
- Ni no Kuni: Wrath of the White Witch (2011)
- The Wind Rises (2013)
- The Tale of the Princess Kaguya (2013)
- Ni no Kuni II: Revenant Kingdom (2018)
- The Boy and the Heron (2023)
- A Big Bold Beautiful Journey (2025)
