= Ni no Kuni II: Revenant Kingdom =

2018 video game

- Developer: Level-5
- Publisher: Bandai Namco Entertainment: JP: Level-5
- Directors: Yoshiaki Kusuda; Takafumi Koukami
- Designers: Kengo Shibata; Yuichi Murase
- Programmers: Yasuhiro Akasaka; Yusuke Hashimoto; Ryosuke Nakahara
- Artists: Nobuyuki Yanai; Hiroshi Matsuyama; Hiroyuki Maeda
- Writer: Akihiro Hino
- Composer: Joe Hisaishi
- Series: Ni no Kuni
- Platforms: PlayStation 4; Windows; Nintendo Switch; Xbox One; Xbox Series X/S
- Release: PS4, Windows; March 23, 2018; Nintendo Switch; September 17, 2021; Xbox One, Series X/S; March 21, 2023
- Genre: Action role-playing
- Mode: Single-player

Ni no Kuni II: Revenant Kingdom (Note: Ni no Kuni: Revananto Kingudamu (Japanese: 二ノ国II レヴァナントキングダム)) is an action role-playing game developed by Level-5 and published by Bandai Namco Entertainment. The game is a sequel to Ni no Kuni: Wrath of the White Witch, and was released for PlayStation 4 and Windows on March 23, 2018. The game was later released for the Nintendo Switch on September 17, 2021, and for Xbox One and Xbox Series X/S on March 21, 2023.

The story follows Evan Pettiwhisker Tildrum, a young king who was usurped from his castle and sets out to build a new kingdom. While players can freely navigate Evan throughout the game's overworld, other characters in the party can be freely controlled in battles. During these battles, players use magical abilities and are assisted by elemental creatures known as "Higgledies", which are used to cast spells and grant other combat bonuses. The game received generally positive critical reception, and sold over 900,000 copies worldwide by May 2018.

== Gameplay ==
Ni no Kuni II: Revenant Kingdom is a role-playing game played from a third-person perspective. Players complete quests—linear scenarios with set objectives—to progress through the story. Outside of quests, players can freely roam the open world, where they explore towns, villages, dungeons, and other dangerous places scattered throughout the world. Upon leaving a location, players enter the World Map, which can be used to select a destination; the overworld represents a diorama, and the characters are portrayed with a chibi-like design.

When players encounter enemies, they enter a battle system. Battles take place on an open battlefield, allowing players to freely roam around the area. During battles, players command a single ally in their party; a party consists of three chosen characters, which can be switched between at any time during battle. The other two characters that the player does not command fight freely on their own. To fight enemies, players use melee attacks, magical abilities and "Higgledies". Higgledies are small creatures which exist in several forms, representing one of six elements, each with their own strengths. Players can have up to four in a party at one time.

In Revenant Kingdom, players have the ability to build and manage Evan's kingdom, focusing on the arrangement of work-forces within the town to provide materials and shops, such as for weapons and armor.

== Synopsis ==
=== Setting ===
Revenant Kingdom is set hundreds of years after the events of Ni no Kuni: Wrath of the White Witch. The game begins in the kingdom of Ding Dong Dell, which features the cat-like Grimalkin and mouse-like Mousekin races which have a history of animosity. The kingdom is ruled by the House of Tildrum, with its current heir, Evan, preparing himself to assume the throne after his father's untimely death.

Aside from Ding Dong Dell, the world is divided among three other major realms: Goldpaw, focused on gambling and tourism, ruled by the Dogfolk; Hydropolis, a secluded marine nation of merfolk and humans; and Broadleaf, an industrious, highly advanced nation formed by a corporation that grew large enough to establish its independence. Each country's ruler has a bond with a powerful being known as a Kingmaker. This bond is known as a Kingsbond, and it not only acts as a proof of authority, but also to protect the country and its population from harm. The bond between a ruler and its Kingmaker can only be broken when the ruler dies, or is forcefully stolen, which is only possible when the support of their subjects falter.

The two main protagonists are Evan Pettiwhisker Tildrum, a child and rightful heir of Ding Dong Dell, and Roland Crane, a president from an unnamed nation of Earth who is transmigrated to the world of Ni no Kuni in a younger form of himself, and becomes Evan's friend and loyal companion. The party also includes Tani, a girl of Evan's age; her father Batu, from a tribe of sky pirates; Leander, a young man who is the advisor for Queen Nerea of the island kingdom of Hydropolis; and Bracken Meadows, a young woman who is the top engineer and one of the founders of the industrious country of Broadleaf.

=== Plot ===
The game begins with Roland witnessing a missile exploding over a city. In the aftermath, he vanishes and reappears in front of Evan in Ding Dong Dell, with his youth suddenly regained, just as Mausinger, the advisor to Evan's late father, stages a coup. As they escape, they learn that Mausinger poisoned the previous king and intends to have Evan killed to assume control of the kingdom. Assisted by Evan's governess Aranella, who sacrifices herself for their safety, Evan and Roland escape safely from Ding Dong Dell, with Evan promising to her that he will establish a new kingdom in which everyone can be happy and free. Since then, he is occasionally approached in his dreams by a mysterious boy around his age, who becomes his confidant.

Given this, Evan and Roland travel to Cloudcoil Canyon to reach the Kings' Cradle to seek out a Kingmaker for themselves. There, they are joined by a group of sky-pirates, their boss Batu, and his daughter Tani who help them reach the shrine in which Evan undergoes a trial to make a bond with a new Kingmaker. Upon success, Evan is joined by the tiny Lofty, his new Kingmaker. After settling in an unclaimed plain area, Roland instructs Evan to make contact with a neighboring kingdom: Goldpaw, where they learn that Goldpaw's ruler, Master Pugnacius, is making use of rigged gambling to exploit the population. Once Pugnacius is exposed by the party, his Kingsbond is taken by a mysterious man called Doloran. The party later learns that Doloran was once a king from a long lost Kingdom that disappeared in a single day. Despite his errors, Pugnacius retains the support of his people, as he was just being manipulated by Doloran to do his bidding.

Back to their settlement, the party, along with the pirates and immigrants from other nations, establish the nation of Evermore. To plan their next step, Evan and the others seek for knowledge at Goldpaw's library where they learn of Ferdinand, an ancient king who once united the kingdoms of the whole world through a "Declaration of Interdependance", which inspires Evan to do the same. After convincing Pugnacius to sign the declaration, Evan and the others set to Hydropolis, where they fail to prevent Doloran from stealing Queen Nerea's Kingsbond but convince her to sign the declaration. Nerea's loyal advisor and true love, Leander, agrees to join the party to stop Doloran's schemes. A similar situation occurs in Broadleaf, where Doloran steals the Kingsbond from President Zip Vector, who also agrees to sign the declaration afterwards, and the party is joined by Bracken.

After returning to Evermore, Roland leaves temporarily and sets to Ding Dong Dell, where he feigns allegiance with Mausinger in order to retrieve the Mark of Kings, an important artifact belonging to the royal family. After Roland returns to the party, they hold an audience with Mausinger in order to exchange the Mark of Kings for his cooperation, but he attacks them instead. In the occasion, Doloran takes advantage of the conflict to steal Mausinger's Kingsbond and reveals that he corrupted Mausinger's advisor, Vermine, instructing him to turn Mausinger against Evan's father. Instead of rewarding Vermine for his services, Doloran steals his soul and flees. Realizing his errors, Mausinger reforms, and agrees to treat all citizens in Ding Dong Dell equally and sign the declaration.

With four Kingsbonds in his possession, Doloran begins the ritual to retrieve his own Kingsmaker, "The Horned One", stealing the souls of people around the world in the process. In response, the party returns to Goldpaw's library where they find clues about the "Mornstar", a legendary sword capable of destroying the Horned One. After the Mornstar is recreated and entrusted to Evan, the armies of the five nations launch an attack on the Horned One to allow the party to reach and confront Doloran. Facing the party himself, Doloran reveals that Roland is his soulmate from Earth, and should one of them die, the other will perish as well. He also reveals that his true intention is not only to revive his lost kingdom but to restore his former Kingsmaker and lover, Alisandra, who was turned into the Horned One because she defied the gods by loving him. Doloran then asks Roland, whose nation on Earth was destroyed by war, to join his side, but he refuses, and the party defeats Doloran in battle.

Soon after, the Horned One manifests itself and is slain by the party. Alisandra's spirit appears before Doloran and reveals that she actually tried to relinquish her powers to live beside him, but by doing so, these powers converted her into the Horned One, and departs to the afterlife. Evan then convinces Doloran to start anew and rebuild his kingdom. Back to Evermore, Evan and the kings of the other major nations celebrate their victory with their subjects and Roland is sent back home, having one last encounter with Evan before departing. In another encounter with the mysterious boy, Evan discovers that he has actually been talking with Ferdinand in his dreams, who was not a king from the past, but his son and successor instead, who provided advice to the party through Goldpaw's librarian, Boddly, who in reality is a soothsayer. Many years later, Ferdinand assumes his father's throne and accomplishes Evan's dream of uniting all countries in the world. In the post-credits, Roland, back to his original age, pushes forward in his mission to unite all countries of Earth as well, inspired by his journeys with Evan.

== Development ==
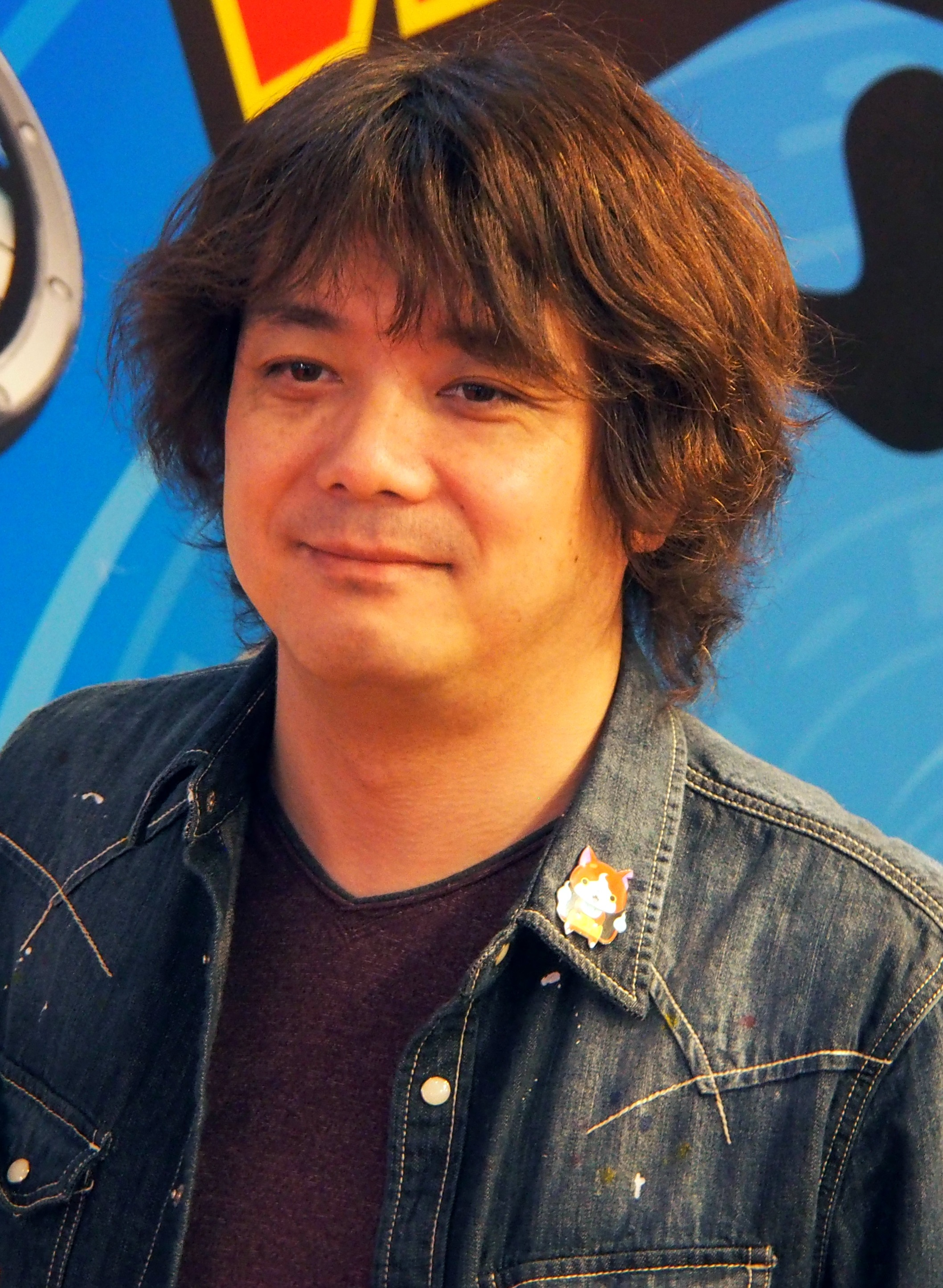
Akihiro Hino returned to write and direct Revenant Kingdom following his work on the previous games.

The game was announced during the PlayStation Experience event in December 2015. Eurogamer described the announcement as a highlight of the event. Unlike the first game, which was a collaboration with Studio Ghibli, the sequel did not have their involvement. Despite that, former Ghibli character designer Yoshiyuki Momose and longtime music composer Joe Hisaishi, both of whom worked on Wrath of the White Witch, reprised their lead roles. Level-5 CEO Akihiro Hino said that the sequel would better fulfill the ambitions of the original game, with deeper stories and improved visuals. The character of Roland was developed to allow older players to feel more engaged with the story, due to his age. The "Higgledies" were introduced to refresh the battle system.

Delayed twice prior to its launch, it was released for PlayStation 4 and Windows on March 23, 2018. In addition to the standard version of the game, players can also purchase three different editions, depending on region. A "day one edition" included a downloadable content pack that added five unique weapons. The premium edition features a steelbook, papercraft kit, a collection of original songs, and the Dragon's Tooth DLC, while the collector's edition includes all of that in addition to behind-the-scenes videos, an art book, a diorama, a plush, a display case, and the season pass; in Europe and Australia, the "Prince's Edition" features a steelbook, behind-the-scenes videos, and the season pass, while the "King's Edition" features the same in addition to a vinyl record, art book, and a diorama music box. A soundtrack, featuring Hisaishi's contributions and performances by the Tokyo Philharmonic Orchestra, was released on June 6, 2018.

In response to criticism about the game being too easy, an update adding two new difficulty modes was released in June 2018. The game received three downloadable content (DLC) packs, with the first releasing on August 9, 2018, the second titled The Lair of the Lost Lord on December 13, 2018, and the third titled The Tale of a Timeless Tome on March 19, 2019.

The Prince’s Edition of the game that includes all previous downloadable content packs, was released worldwide on September 17, 2021 for the Nintendo Switch. A version of the game for Xbox One and Xbox Series X/S was announced during Tokyo Game Show in September 2022, and released on March 21, 2023.

== Reception ==
Reception

Aggregate score
| Aggregator | Score |
|---|---|
| Metacritic | (PS4) 84/100 (PC) 81/100 (NS) 79/100 |

Review scores
| Publication | Score |
|---|---|
| Destructoid | 7.5/10 |
| Electronic Gaming Monthly | 8.5/10 |
| Famitsu | 38/40 |
| Game Informer | 8/10 |
| GameRevolution | 3.5/5 |
| GameSpot | 8/10 |
| GamesRadar+ | 4.5/5 |
| IGN | 7.8/10 |
| PC Gamer (US) | 90/100 |
| Polygon | 9/10 |

Ni no Kuni II: Revenant Kingdom received "generally positive" reviews according to review aggregator Metacritic. Writing for Waypoint, Cameron Kunzelman described the game as a fairy tale about good governance, showing a state which tries to support its population, as opposed to the cynical depictions of the state which most games in the genre hold.

=== Sales ===
By May 2018, Ni no Kuni II: Revenant Kingdom had surpassed over 900,000 total shipments and digital downloads worldwide.

=== Accolades ===
List of awards and nominations for Ni no Kuni II: Revenant Kingdom
| Date | Award | Category | Recipient(s) and nominee(s) | Result | Ref. |
|---|---|---|---|---|---|
| June 28, 2017 | 2017 Game Critics Awards | Best Role Playing Game | Ni no Kuni II: Revenant Kingdom | Won | |
| August 24, 2017 | Best of Gamescom 2017 | Best Role-Playing Game | Ni no Kuni II: Revenant Kingdom | Won | |
| August 24, 2017 | Best of Gamescom 2017 | Best Booth Award | Ni no Kuni II: Revenant Kingdom | Nominated | |
| August 24, 2017 | Best of Gamescom 2017 | Best Console Award (PlayStation 4) | Ni no Kuni II: Revenant Kingdom | Nominated | |
| August 24, 2017 | Best of Gamescom 2017 | Best Family Game | Ni no Kuni II: Revenant Kingdom | Nominated | |
| November 16, 2018 | 36th Golden Joystick Awards | PlayStation Game of the Year | Ni no Kuni II: Revenant Kingdom | Nominated | |
| December 6, 2018 | The Game Awards 2018 | Best Score/Music | Ni no Kuni II: Revenant Kingdom | Nominated | |
| December 6, 2018 | The Game Awards 2018 | Best Role-Playing Game | Ni no Kuni II: Revenant Kingdom | Nominated | |
| December 9, 2018 | Gamers' Choice Awards | Fan Favorite Role Playing Game | Ni no Kuni II: Revenant Kingdom | Nominated | |
| December 10, 2018 | Titanium Awards | Best Original Soundtrack | Joe Hisaishi | Nominated | |
| December 10, 2018 | Titanium Awards | Best Role-Playing Game | Ni no Kuni II: Revenant Kingdom | Nominated | |
| January 22, 2019 | New York Game Awards | Big Apple Award for Best Game of the Year | Ni no Kuni II: Revenant Kingdom | Nominated | |
| February 13, 2019 | 22nd Annual D.I.C.E. Awards | Role-Playing Game of the Year | Ni no Kuni II: Revenant Kingdom | Nominated | |
| March 13, 2019 | National Academy of Video Game Trade Reviewers Awards | Game, Franchise Role Playing | Ni no Kuni II: Revenant Kingdom | Nominated | |
| March 21, 2019 | 2019 G.A.N.G. Awards | G.A.N.G. / MAGFEST People's Choice Award | Ni no Kuni II: Revenant Kingdom | Nominated | |
| April 11, 2019 | Italian Video Game Awards | Best Audio | Ni no Kuni II: Revenant Kingdom | Nominated | |
