= List of awards and nominations received by Michael Giacchino =

Michael Giacchino awards and nominations
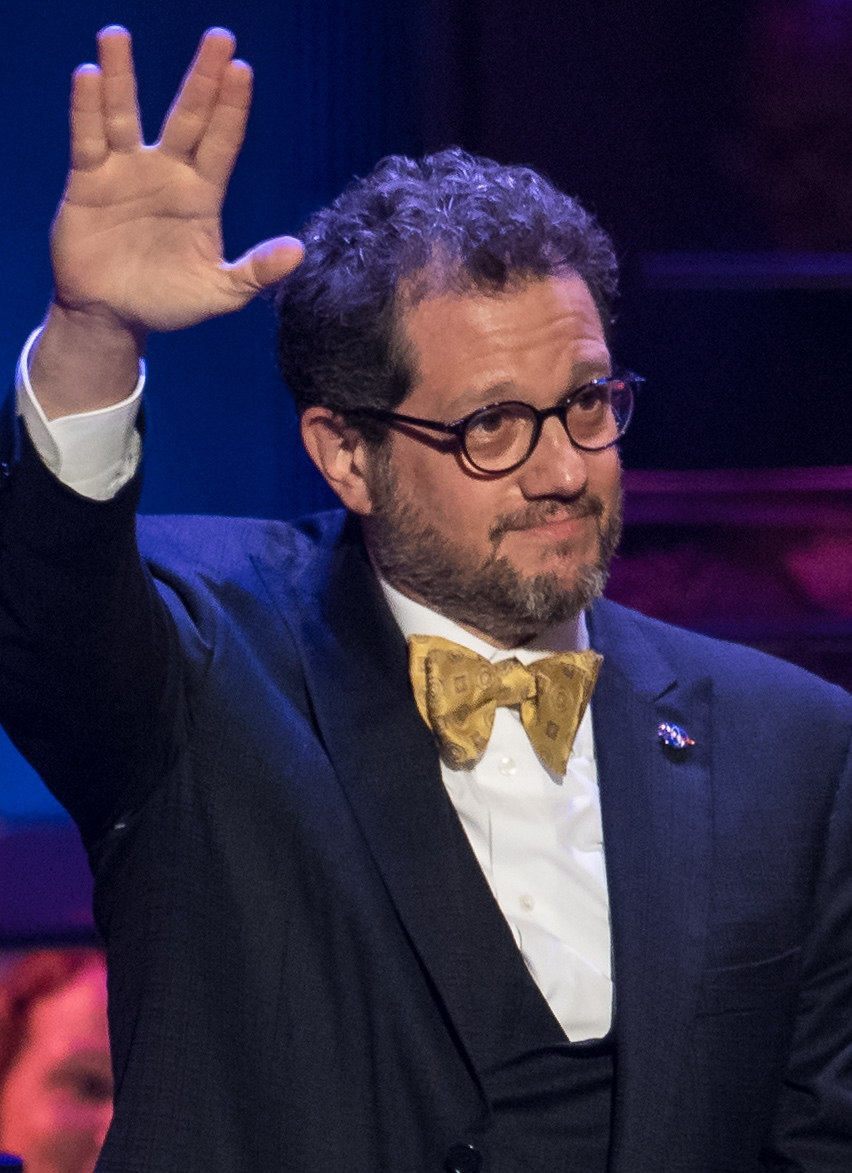
Giacchino in 2018
Awards and nominations
Award	Wins	Nominations
Totals
Academy Awards	1	2
Annie Awards	6	9
Astra Awards	0	1
Atlanta Film Critics Circle	1	1
Austin Film Critics Association	1	3
BMI Film & TV Awards	2	2
British Academy Film Awards	1	2
Central Ohio Film Critics Association	1	2
Chicago Film Critics Association	1	4
Chicago Indie Critics Awards	0	2
Critics Association of Central Florida	1	1
Critics' Choice Movie Awards	1	4
Georgia Film Critics Association	1	2
Denver Film Critics Society	0	2
DiscussingFilm Critics Awards	0	1
Gold Derby Awards	2	6
Golden Globe Awards	1	1
Grammy Awards	3	9
Greater Western New York Film Critics Association	1	1
Hawaii Film Critics Society	0	3
Hollywood Music in Media Awards	1	12
Houston Film Critics Society	1	3
Indiana Film Journalists Association	1	1
International Cinephile Society	0	3
International Film Music Critics Association	22	64
Las Vegas Film Critics Society	2	2
Latino Entertainment Journalists Association	1	1
Los Angeles Film Critics Association	1	1
Los Angeles Online Film Critics Society	0	1
Minnesota Film Critics Alliance	1	1
Music City Film Critics Association	0	1
North Carolina Film Critics Association	1	2
Oklahoma Film Critics Circle	0	1
Online Film & Television Association	3	5
Online Film Critics Society	2	4
Phoenix Critics Circle	0	1
Phoenix Film Critics Society	1	2
Primetime Emmy Awards	1	5
San Diego Film Critics Society	0	1
San Francisco Bay Area Film Critics Circle	0	1
Satellite Awards	0	7
Saturn Awards	2	10
Seattle Film Critics Society	0	2
Society of Composers & Lyricists	0	2
Southeastern Film Critics Association	1	1
St. Louis Film Critics Association	0	3
Sunset Film Circle	0	1
Utah Film Critics Association	0	1
Washington D.C. Area Film Critics Association	1	2
World Soundtrack Awards	2	4
Wins	69
Nominations	201

Michael Giacchino is an American composer of music for films, television and video games. The following are a list of his wins and nominations for awards in music.

He's received an Academy Award, a BAFTA Award, a Critics' Choice Movie Award, a Primetime Emmy Award, and three Grammy Awards.

== Major awards ==
=== Academy Awards ===
Year	Category	Nominated work	Result	Ref.
2007	Best Original Score	Ratatouille	Nominated	
2009	Best Original Score	Up	Won	

=== British Academy Film Awards ===
Year	Category	Nominated work	Result	Ref.
2009	Best Original Music	Up	Won	
2019	Best Original Music	Jojo Rabbit	Nominated	

=== Critics' Choice Movie Awards ===
Year	Category	Nominated work	Result	Ref.
2004	Best Composer	The Incredibles	Nominated	
2009	Best Score	Up	Won	
2022	Best Score	The Batman	Nominated	
2023	Best Score	Society of the Snow	Nominated	

=== Golden Globe Awards ===
Year	Category	Nominated work	Result	Ref.
2009	Best Original Score	Up	Won	

=== Grammy Awards ===
Year	Category	Nominated work	Result	Ref.
2005	Best Score Soundtrack Album for Motion Picture, Television or Other Visual Media	The Incredibles	Nominated	
2005	Best Instrumental Composition	"The Incredits" (from The Incredibles)	Nominated	
2007	Best Score Soundtrack Album for Motion Picture, Television or Other Visual Media	Ratatouille	Won	
2009	Best Score Soundtrack Album for Motion Picture, Television or Other Visual Media	Star Trek	Nominated	
2009	Best Score Soundtrack Album for Motion Picture, Television or Other Visual Media	Up	Won	
2009	Best Instrumental Composition	"Married Life"	Won	
2009	Best Instrumental Arrangement	"Up with End Credits"	Nominated	
2018	Best Score Soundtrack for Visual Media	Coco	Nominated	
2022	Best Score Soundtrack for Visual Media	The Batman	Nominated	

=== Primetime Emmy Awards ===
Year	Category	Nominated work	Result	Ref.
2005	Outstanding Music and Lyrics	"When I'm With You" (from The Muppets' Wizard of Oz) (Note: Shared with Jeannie Lurie, Adam Cohen, Debra Frank, and Steve L. Hayes.)	Nominated	
2005	Outstanding Music Composition for a Series (Dramatic Underscore)	Lost (Episode: "Pilot")	Won	
2008	Outstanding Music Composition for a Series (Original Dramatic Score)	Lost (Episode: "The Constant")	Nominated	
2010	Outstanding Music Composition for a Series (Original Dramatic Score)	Lost (Episode: "The End")	Nominated	
2012	Outstanding Music Composition for a Miniseries, Movie or a Special (Original Dramatic Score)	Prep & Landing: Naughty vs. Nice	Nominated	

== Miscellaneous awards ==
=== Annie Awards ===
Year	Category	Nominated work	Result	Ref.
2004	Outstanding Individual Achievement for Music in an Animated Feature Production	The Incredibles	Won	
2007	Outstanding Individual Achievement for Music in an Animated Feature Production	Ratatouille	Won	
2009	Outstanding Individual Achievement for Music in an Animated Feature Production	Up	Nominated	
2009	Outstanding Individual Achievement for Music in an Animated Television/Broadcast Production	Prep & Landing	Nominated	
2011	Outstanding Individual Achievement for Music in an Animated Television/Broadcast Production	Prep & Landing: Naughty vs. Nice (Note: Shared with Grace Potter.)	Won	
2015	Outstanding Individual Achievement for Music in an Animated Feature Production	Inside Out	Won	
2017	Outstanding Individual Achievement for Music in an Animated Feature Production	Coco (Note: Shared with Kristen Anderson-Lopez, Robert Lopez, Germaine Franco, and Adrian Molina.)	Won	
2018	Outstanding Individual Achievement for Music in an Animated Feature Production	Incredibles 2	Won	
2025	Outstanding Individual Achievement for Music in an Animated Feature Production	Zootopia 2 (Note: Shared with Shakira, Ed Sheeran, and Blake Slatkin)	Nominated	

=== Astra Awards ===
Year	Category	Nominated work	Result	Ref.
2022	Best Score	The Batman	Nominated	

=== Atlanta Film Critics Circle Awards ===
Year	Category	Nominated work	Result	Ref.
2022	Best Original Score	The Batman	Won	

=== Austin Film Critics Association Awards ===
Year	Category	Nominated work	Result	Ref.
2009	Best Original Score	Up	Won	
2015	Best Score	Inside Out	Nominated	
2022	Best Original Score	The Batman	Nominated	

=== BMI Film & TV Awards ===
Year	Category	Nominated work	Result	Ref.
2005	Film Music	The Incredibles	Won	
2005	Television	Lost	Won	

=== Central Ohio Film Critics Association Awards ===
Year	Category	Nominated work	Result	Ref.
2009	Best Score	Up	Won	
2015	Best Score	Inside Out	Nominated	

=== Chicago Film Critics Association Awards ===
Year	Category	Nominated work	Result	Ref.
2009	Best Original Score	Up	Won	
2015	Best Original Score	Inside Out	Nominated	
2017	Best Original Score	War for the Planet of the Apes	Nominated	
2022	Best Original Score	The Batman	Nominated	

=== Chicago Indie Critics Awards ===
Year	Category	Nominated work	Result	Ref.
2017	Best Original Score	War for the Planet of the Apes	Nominated	
2022	Best Original Score	The Batman	Nominated	

=== Critics Association of Central Florida Awards ===
Year	Category	Nominated work	Result	Ref.
2022	Best Score	The Batman	Won	

=== Denver Film Critics Society Awards ===
Year	Category	Nominated work	Result	Ref.
2019	Best Score	Jojo Rabbit	Nominated	
2022	Best Score	The Batman	Nominated	

=== DiscussingFilm Critics Awards ===
Year	Category	Nominated work	Result	Ref.
2022	Best Original Score	The Batman	Nominated	

=== Georgia Film Critics Association Awards ===
Year	Category	Nominated work	Result	Ref.
2017	Best Original Score	War for the Planet of the Apes	Nominated	
2022	Best Original Score	The Batman	Won	

=== Greater Western New York Film Critics Association Awards ===
Year	Category	Nominated work	Result	Ref.
2022	Best Score	The Batman	Won	

=== Goya Awards ===
Year	Category	Nominated work	Result	Ref.
2023	Best Original Score	Society of the Snow	Won	

=== Hawaii Film Critics Society Awards ===
Year	Category	Nominated work	Result	Ref.
2017	Best Original Score	War for the Planet of the Apes	Nominated	
2019	Best Original Score	Jojo Rabbit	Nominated	
2022	Best Original Score	The Batman	Nominated	

=== Hollywood Music in Media Awards ===
Year	Category	Nominated work	Result	Ref.
2014	Best Original Score – Sci-Fi/Fantasy	Dawn of the Planet of the Apes	Nominated	
2015	Best Original Score – Sci-Fi/Fantasy	Tomorrowland	Nominated	
2016	Best Original Score – Animated	Zootopia	Nominated	
2016	Best Original Score – Sci-Fi/Fantasy	Doctor Strange	Nominated	
2018	Best Original Score – Animated	Incredibles 2	Nominated	
2019	Best Original Score – Feature Film	Jojo Rabbit	Nominated	
2019	Best Original Score – Sci-Fi/Fantasy	Spider-Man: Far from Home	Nominated	
2022	Best Original Score – Sci-Fi/Fantasy	The Batman	Nominated	
2022	Best Original Score – Sci-Fi/Fantasy	Spider-Man: No Way Home	Nominated	
2022	Best Original Score – Sci-Fi/Fantasy	Thor: Love and Thunder	Nominated	
2023	Best Original Score – Independent Film (Foreign Language)	Society of the Snow	Won	
2024	Best Original Score – Sci-Fi/Fantasy	IF	Nominated	

=== Houston Film Critics Society Awards ===
Year	Category	Nominated work	Result	Ref.
2009	Best Original Score	Up	Won	
2015	Best Original Score	Inside Out	Nominated	
2017	Best Original Score	War for the Planet of the Apes	Nominated	

=== Indiana Film Journalists Association Awards ===
Year	Category	Nominated work	Result	Ref.
2022	Best Musical Score	The Batman	Won	

=== IndieWire Critics Poll ===
Year	Category	Nominated work	Result	Ref.
2015	Best Original Score/Soundtrack	Inside Out	9th Place	

=== International Cinephile Society Awards ===
Year	Category	Nominated work	Result	Ref.
2004	Best Original Score	The Incredibles	Nominated	
2009	Best Original Score	Star Trek	Nominated	
2009	Best Original Score	Up	Nominated	

=== International Film Music Critics Association Awards ===
Year	Category	Nominated work	Result	Ref.
2004	Film Composer of the Year	—N/a	Won	
2004	Film Score of the Year	The Incredibles	Won	
2004	Best Original Score for an Action/Adventure Film	The Incredibles	Won	
2004	Best Original Score for Television	Lost	Nominated	
2005	Best Original Score for Television	Lost	Won	
2006	Best Original Score for an Action/Thriller Film	Mission: Impossible III	Nominated	
2006	Best Original Score for Television	Lost	Nominated	
2007	Film Composer of the Year	—N/a	Nominated	
2007	Film Score of the Year	Ratatouille	Nominated	
2007	Best Original Score for an Animated Film	Ratatouille	Won	
2007	Best Original Score for Television	Lost	Nominated	
2007	Best Original Score for a Video Game or Interactive Media	Medal of Honor: Airborne	Nominated	
2008	Best Original Score for an Action/Adventure Film	Speed Racer	Nominated	
2008	Film Music Composition of the Year	"Roar! (Overture)" (from Cloverfield)	Won	
2008	Best Original Score for Television	Lost	Nominated	
2009	Film Composer of the Year	—N/a	Won	
2009	Film Score of the Year	Star Trek	Nominated	
2009	Film Score of the Year	Up	Won	
2009	Best Original Score for an Animated Feature	Up	Won	
2009	Best Original Score for a Documentary Feature	Earth Days	Nominated	
2009	Best Original Score for a Fantasy/Science Fiction Film	Star Trek	Won	
2009	Film Music Composition of the Year	"Enterprising Young Men" (from Star Trek)	Nominated	
2009	Film Music Composition of the Year	"Married Life" (from Up)	Nominated	
2009	Best Original Score for Television	Lost: Season 5	Nominated	
2010	Best Original Score for a Television Series	Lost	Nominated	
2011	Film Composer of the Year	—N/a	Nominated	
2011	Best Original Score for an Action/Adventure/Thriller Film	Mission: Impossible – Ghost Protocol	Nominated	
2011	Best Original Score for a Fantasy/Science Fiction/Horror Film	Super 8	Won	
2012	Best Original Score for a Fantasy/Science Fiction/Horror Film	John Carter	Won	
2012	Film Music Composition of the Year	"John Carter of Mars" (from John Carter)	Nominated	
2013	Best Original Score for a Fantasy/Science Fiction/Horror Film	Star Trek Into Darkness	Nominated	
2015	Film Composer of the Year	—N/a	Won	
2015	Film Score of the Year	Jupiter Ascending	Nominated	
2015	Best Original Score for a Fantasy/Science Fiction/Horror Film	Jupiter Ascending	Nominated	
2015	Best Original Score for an Animated Feature	Inside Out	Won	
2015	Film Music Composition of the Year	"Pin-Ultimate Experience" (from Tomorrowland)	Nominated	
2016	Film Composer of the Year	—N/a	Won	
2016	Best Original Score for an Animated Film	Zootopia	Nominated	
2016	Best Original Score for a Fantasy/Science Fiction/Horror Film	Doctor Strange	Nominated	
2016	Film Music Composition of the Year	"The Master of the Mystic End Credits" (from Doctor Strange)	Nominated	
2016	Film Music Composition of the Year	"Night on the Yorktown" (from Star Trek Beyond)	Nominated	
2017	Film Composer of the Year	—N/a	Nominated	
2017	Film Score of the Year	War for the Planet of the Apes	Nominated	
2017	Best Original Score for a Fantasy/Science Fiction/Horror Film	War for the Planet of the Apes	Won	
2017	Best Original Score for an Animated Film	Coco	Nominated	
2017	Film Music Composition of the Year	"End Credits" (from War for the Planet of the Apes)	Won	
2018	Best Original Score for an Animated Film	Incredibles 2	Nominated	
2018	Best Original Score for a Fantasy/Science Fiction/Horror Film	Jurassic World: Fallen Kingdom	Nominated	
2019	Best Original Score for a Comedy Film	Jojo Rabbit	Won	
2020	Best Original Score for a Comedy Film	An American Pickle (Note: Shared with Nami Melumad.)	Nominated	
2020	Best Original Score for a Video Game or Interactive Media	Medal of Honor: Above and Beyond (Note: Shared with Nami Melumad.)	Won	
2021	Best Original Score for a Fantasy/Science Fiction/Horror Film	Spider-Man: No Way Home	Nominated	
2021	Film Music Composition of the Year	"Arachnoverture" (from Spider-Man: No Way Home)	Won	
2022	Composer of the Year	—N/a	Nominated	
2022	Score of the Year	The Batman	Nominated	
2022	Best Original Score for an Action/Adventure Film	The Batman	Won	
2022	Best Original Score for a Fantasy/Science Fiction Film	Jurassic World Dominion	Nominated	
2022	Best Original Score for an Animated Film	Lightyear	Nominated	
2022	Composition of the Year	"The Batman" (from The Batman)	Nominated	
2025	Composer of the Year	—N/a	Nominated	
2025	Score of the Year	The Fantastic Four: First Steps	Nominated	
2025	Best Original Score for a Fantasy/Science Fiction Film	The Fantastic Four: First Steps	Nominated	
2025	Best Original Score for an Animated Film	Zootopia 2	Won	
2025	Composition of the Year	"The Fantastic Four: First Steps Main Theme" (from The Fantastic Four: First Steps)	Nominated	

=== Las Vegas Film Critics Society Awards ===
Year	Category	Nominated work	Result	Ref.
2004	Best Score	The Incredibles	Won	
2008	Best Score	Star Trek	Won	

=== Latino Entertainment Journalists Association Film Awards ===
Year	Category	Nominated work	Result	Ref.
2022	Best Musical Score	The Batman	Won	

=== Los Angeles Film Critics Association Awards ===
Year	Category	Nominated work	Result	Ref.
2004	Best Music Score	The Incredibles	Won	

=== Los Angeles Online Film Critics Society Awards ===
Year	Category	Nominated work	Result	Ref.
2017	Best Score	War for the Planet of the Apes	Nominated	

=== Minnesota Film Critics Alliance Awards ===
Year	Category	Nominated work	Result	Ref.
2022	Best Music	The Batman	Won	

=== Music City Film Critics Association Awards ===
Year	Category	Nominated work	Result	Ref.
2022	Best Score	The Batman	Nominated	

=== North Carolina Film Critics Association Awards ===
Year	Category	Nominated work	Result	Ref.
2019	Best Music	Jojo Rabbit	Nominated	
2022	Best Score	The Batman	Won	

=== Oklahoma Film Critics Circle Awards ===
Year	Category	Nominated work	Result	Ref.
2022	Best Score	The Batman	Runner-up	

=== Online Film & Television Association Awards ===
Year	Category	Nominated work	Result	Ref.
2004	Best Original Score	The Incredibles	Won	
2007	Best Original Score	Ratatouille	Nominated	
2007	Best Original Song	"Le Festin"	Nominated	
2009	Best Original Score	Up	Won	
2021	Film Hall of Fame: Support	—N/a	Inducted	
2022	Best Original Score	The Batman	Won	

=== Online Film Critics Society Awards ===
Year	Category	Nominated work	Result	Ref.
2004	Best Original Score	The Incredibles	Won	
2009	Best Original Score	Star Trek	Nominated	
2009	Best Original Score	Up	Won	
2022	Best Original Score	The Batman	Nominated	

=== Phoenix Critics Circle Awards ===
Year	Category	Nominated work	Result	Ref.
2022	Best Score	The Batman	Nominated	

=== Phoenix Film Critics Society Awards ===
Year	Category	Nominated work	Result	Ref.
2009	Best Original Score	Up	Won	
2011	Best Original Score	Super 8	Nominated	

=== San Diego Film Critics Society Awards ===
Year	Category	Nominated work	Result	Ref.
2009	Best Score	Up	Runner-up	

=== San Francisco Bay Area Film Critics Circle Awards ===
Year	Category	Nominated work	Result	Ref.
2017	Best Original Score	War for the Planet of the Apes	Nominated	

=== Satellite Awards ===
Year	Category	Nominated work	Result	Ref.
2004	Best Original Score	The Incredibles	Nominated	
2007	Best Original Score	Ratatouille	Nominated	
2009	Best Original Score	Up	Nominated	
2011	Best Original Score	Super 8	Nominated	
2015	Best Original Score	Inside Out	Nominated	
2017	Best Original Score	War for the Planet of the Apes	Nominated	
2023	Best Original Score	Society of the Snow	Nominated	

=== Saturn Awards ===
Year	Category	Nominated work	Result	Ref.
2004	Best Music	The Incredibles	Nominated	
2009	Best Music	Up	Nominated	
2010	Best Music	Let Me In	Nominated	
2011	Best Music	Mission: Impossible – Ghost Protocol	Nominated	
2011	Best Music	Super 8	Won	
2014	Best Music	Dawn of the Planet of the Apes	Nominated	
2016	Best Music	Doctor Strange	Nominated	
2016	Best Music	Rogue One: A Star Wars Story	Nominated	
2017	Best Music	Coco	Won	
2022	Best Music	The Batman	Nominated	

=== Seattle Film Critics Society Awards ===
Year	Category	Nominated work	Result	Ref.
2017	Best Original Score	War for the Planet of the Apes	Nominated	
2022	Best Original Score	The Batman	Nominated	

=== Society of Composers & Lyricists ===
Year	Category	Nominated work	Result	Ref.
2019	Outstanding Original Score for a Studio Film	Jojo Rabbit	Nominated	
2022	Outstanding Original Score for a Studio Film	The Batman	Nominated	

=== Southeastern Film Critics Association Awards ===
Year	Category	Nominated work	Result	Ref.
2022	Best Score	The Batman	Won	

=== St. Louis Gateway Film Critics Association Awards ===
Year	Category	Nominated work	Result	Ref.
2009	Best Music	Up	Nominated	
2015	Best Music	Inside Out	Runner-up	
2022	Best Score	The Batman	Nominated	

=== Sunset Film Circle Awards ===
Year	Category	Nominated work	Result	Ref.
2022	Best Score	The Batman	Nominated	

=== Utah Film Critics Association Awards ===
Year	Category	Nominated work	Result	Ref.
2022	Best Original Score	The Batman	Runner-up	

=== Washington D.C. Area Film Critics Association Awards ===
Year	Category	Nominated work	Result	Ref.
2017	Best Original Score	Coco	Nominated	
2022	Best Original Score	The Batman	Won	

=== World Soundtrack Awards ===
Year	Category	Nominated work	Result	Ref.
2005	Discovery of the Year	The Incredibles	Won	
2007	Best Original Song Written for a Film	"Le Festin" (from Ratatouille)	Nominated	
2009	Soundtrack Composer of the Year	Land of the Lost / Star Trek / Up	Nominated	
2015	Film Composer of the Year	Dawn of the Planet of the Apes / Inside Out / Jupiter Ascending / Jurassic World / Tomorrowland	Won	

== Other awards ==
- 2001 Interactive Achievement Award for Original Musical Composition – Medal of Honor: Underground
- 2003 Game Developers Choice Award for Excellence in Audio – Medal of Honor: Allied Assault
- 2003 Interactive Achievement Award for Outstanding Achievement in Original Music Composition – Medal of Honor: Frontline
- 2004 Game Developer Choice Award for Excellence in Audio – Call of Duty
- 2007 Film & TV Music Award for Best Score for a Short Film – Lifted
- 2007 StreamingSoundtracks.com Award for Composer of the Year

=== Recognition ===
- The score for season 1 of Lost was cited by New Yorker music critic Alex Ross as "some of the most compelling film music of the past year".

=== Conductor ===
- Conductor of the 81st Academy Awards in 2009.
