= List of accolades received by Joe Hisaishi =

Joe Hisaishi accolades
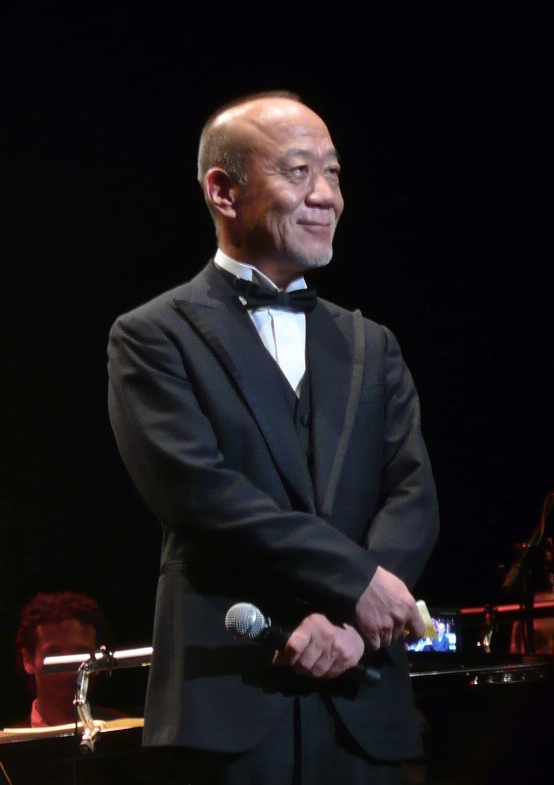
- Hisaishi in 2011
Awards and nominations
Award	Wins	Nominations
Asian Film Awards	2	3
Annie Awards	2	5
Blue Dragon Film Awards	0	1
Chicago Film Critics Association	0	1
Dorian Awards	0	1
Far East Film Festival	1	1
Florida Film Critics Circle Awards	1	1
The Game Awards	0	1
Golden Globe Awards	0	1
Golden Horse Awards	0	1
Grand Bell Awards	0	1
Hong Kong Film Awards	2	3
Houston Film Critics Society Awards	0	1
International Cinephile Society Awards	1	3
International Film Music Critics Association Awards	5	8
Japan Academy Film Prize	8	16
Japan Gold Disc Awards	4	4
Japan Record Awards	2	2
Japanese Movie Critics Awards	1	1
JASRAC Awards	3	3
Korean Film Awards	1	1
Laurence Olivier Awards	0	1
Los Angeles Film Critics Association Awards	1	1
Mainichi Film Awards	3	3
Music Awards Japan	1	2
Saturn Awards	0	1
Society of Composers & Lyricists Awards	0	1
Tokyo Anime Award	2	2
Yokohama Film Festival	1	1

Totals (Note: Certain award groups do not simply award one winner. They acknowledge several different recipients, have runners-up, and have third place. Since this is a specific recognition and is different from losing an award, runner-up mentions are considered wins in this award tally. For simplification and to avoid errors, each award in this list has been presumed to have had a prior nomination.)
- Wins: 43
- Nominations: 73

Mamoru Fujisawa (Japanese: 藤澤 守, Hepburn: Fujisawa Mamoru; born December 6, 1950), known professionally as Joe Hisaishi (久石 譲, Hisaishi Jō), is a Japanese composer, conductor, and pianist. Over the course of his career, Hisaishi has received over 73 award nominations and has won 43. Hisaishi was recognized by the Government of Japan with the Medal of Honor with Purple Ribbon in 2009, and again in 2023 with the Order of the Rising Sun, 4th Class, Gold Rays with Rosette. For his contributions across his career, Hisaishi was presented the Golden Mulberry Award for Lifetime Achievement at the 2015 Far East Film Festival and the Winsor McCay Award at the 2024 Annie Awards.

Hisaishi began his career creating minimalist and electronic pieces, but he gradually moved to writing for orchestra and creating film scores for directors like Isao Takahata. However, he still occasionally revisited his minimal style, such as his work on Takeshi Kitano's A Scene at the Sea (1991), for which he won Best Music at the Mainichi Film Awards. Hisaishi has since become internationally known for his soundtracks for the films of Hayao Miyazaki, which had started with their collaboration on Nausicaä of the Valley of the Wind (1984). He went on to score several of the highest-grossing films in Japan, and received a number of awards and nominations for his work on the soundtracks of Studio Ghibli films, including wins at the Annie Awards, Japan Gold Disc Awards, and Mainichi Film Awards for the music of Spirited Away (2001), as well as a nomination for Best Original Score at the Golden Globe Awards for the music of The Boy and the Heron (2023). Hisaishi has also received 16 nominations at the Japan Academy Film Prize in the Outstanding Achievement in Music category between 1991 and 2015, earning the award eight times among them. (Note: Attributed to multiple references:)

== Accolades ==
Accolades received by Joe Hisaishi
Award / Organization	Year	Category	Nominated work(s)	Result	Ref.
Asian Film Awards	2009	Best Composer	Ponyo	Won	
Asian Film Awards	2015	Best Composer	Gone with the Bullets	Nominated (Note: Shared with Zhang Yilin, Dou Peng, George Acogny, and Shu Nan)	
Asian Film Awards	2018	Best Original Music	Our Time Will Come	Won	
Annie Awards	2003	Music in an Animated Feature Production	Spirited Away	Won	
Annie Awards	2010	Music in a Feature Production	Ponyo	Nominated	
Annie Awards	2015	Music in a Feature Production	The Tale of the Princess Kaguya	Nominated	
Annie Awards	2024	Outstanding Achievement for Music in a Feature Production	The Boy and the Heron	Nominated	
Annie Awards	2024	Winsor McCay Award	—N/a	Won	
Blue Dragon Film Awards	2005	Best Music	Welcome to Dongmakgol	Nominated	
Chicago Film Critics Association	2003	Best Original Score	Spirited Away	Nominated	
Decoration Bureau of the Cabinet Office	2009	Medal of Honor with Purple Ribbon	—N/a	Honored	
Decoration Bureau of the Cabinet Office	2023	Order of the Rising Sun, 4th Class, Gold Rays with Rosette	—N/a	Honored	
Dorian Awards	2024	Film Music of the Year	The Boy and the Heron	Nominated	
Far East Film Festival	2015	Golden Mulberry Award for Lifetime Achievement	—N/a	Won (Note: Shared with Jackie Chan and Nansun Shi)	
Florida Film Critics Circle Awards	2023	Best Score	The Boy and the Heron	Won	
The Game Awards	2018	Best Score/Music	Ni no Kuni II: Revenant Kingdom	Nominated	
Golden Globe Awards	2024	Best Original Score	The Boy and the Heron	Nominated	
Golden Horse Awards	2017	Best Original Film Score	Our Time Will Come	Nominated	
Grand Bell Awards	2006	Best Music	Welcome to Dongmakgol	Nominated	
Hong Kong Film Awards	2006	Best Original Film Score	A Chinese Tall Story	Nominated	
Hong Kong Film Awards	2008	Best Original Film Score	The Postmodern Life of My Aunt	Won	
Hong Kong Film Awards	2018	Best Original Film Score	Our Time Will Come	Won	
Houston Film Critics Society Awards	2024	Best Original Score	The Boy and the Heron	Nominated	
International Cinephile Society Awards	2010	Best Original Score	Ponyo	Nominated	
International Cinephile Society Awards	2015	Best Score	The Tale of the Princess Kaguya	Nominated	
International Cinephile Society Awards	2024	Best Score	The Boy and the Heron	Won	
International Film Music Critics Association Awards	2007	Best Original Score for Television	The Legend	Won	
International Film Music Critics Association Awards	2008	Best Original Score for an Animated Film	Ponyo	Nominated	
International Film Music Critics Association Awards	2011	Best Original Score for a Video Game or Interactive Media	Ni no Kuni: Wrath of the White Witch	Won	
International Film Music Critics Association Awards	2014	Best Original Score for an Animated Film	The Wind Rises	Won	
International Film Music Critics Association Awards	2018	Best Original Score for a Video Game or Interactive Media	Ni no Kuni II: Revenant Kingdom	Won	
International Film Music Critics Association Awards	2024	Film Score of the Year	The Boy and the Heron	Nominated	
International Film Music Critics Association Awards	2024	Best Original Score for an Animated Film	The Boy and the Heron	Won	
International Film Music Critics Association Awards	2024	Best Archival Release	A Symphonic Celebration: Music from the Studio Ghibli Films of Hayao Miyazaki	Nominated (Note: Shared with Anna Barry (production), Michael Beek (liner notes), and Yuka Araki (album art direction))	
Japan Academy Film Prize	1991	Outstanding Achievement in Music	Kanbakku / Tasmania Story / Tsuribaka Nisshi 2 / Peesuke: Gatapishi Monogatari	Nominated	
Japan Academy Film Prize	1992	Outstanding Achievement in Music	A Scene at the Sea / Deer Friend / Chizuko's Younger Sister / Fukuzawa Yukichi	Won	
Japan Academy Film Prize	1993	Outstanding Achievement in Music	Seishun Dendekedekedeke	Won	
Japan Academy Film Prize	1994	Outstanding Achievement in Music	Sonatine / Haruka, Nostalgia / Samurai Kids	Won	
Japan Academy Film Prize	1997	Outstanding Achievement in Music	Kids Return	Nominated	
Japan Academy Film Prize	1999	Outstanding Achievement in Music	Hana-bi	Won	
Japan Academy Film Prize	2000	Outstanding Achievement in Music	Kikujiro	Won	
Japan Academy Film Prize	2003	Outstanding Achievement in Music	Dolls	Nominated	
Japan Academy Film Prize	2007	Outstanding Achievement in Music	Yamato	Nominated	
Japan Academy Film Prize	2009	Outstanding Achievement in Music	Ponyo	Won	
Japan Academy Film Prize	2009	Outstanding Achievement in Music	Departures	Nominated	
Japan Academy Film Prize	2011	Outstanding Achievement in Music	Villain	Won	
Japan Academy Film Prize	2013	Outstanding Achievement in Music	Tenchi: The Samurai Astronomer	Nominated	
Japan Academy Film Prize	2014	Outstanding Achievement in Music	The Wind Rises	Won	
Japan Academy Film Prize	2014	Outstanding Achievement in Music	Tokyo Family / The Tale of the Princess Kaguya	Nominated	
Japan Academy Film Prize	2015	Outstanding Achievement in Music	The Little House	Nominated	
Japan Gold Disc Awards	2002	Animation Album of the Year	Spirited Away	Won	
Japan Gold Disc Awards	2009	Instrumental Album of the Year	Piano Stories Best '88-'08	Won	
Japan Gold Disc Awards	2009	Soundtrack Album of the Year	Ponyo	Won	
Japan Gold Disc Awards	2024	Classic Album of the Year	A Symphonic Celebration: Music from the Studio Ghibli Films of Hayao Miyazaki	Won	
Japan Record Awards	1997	Composition Award	"Princess Mononoke"	Won (Note: Shared with Yoshikazu Mera (vocals))	
Japan Record Awards	2001	Gold Award	"Always with Me"	Won (Note: Shared with Youmi Kimura (composition and vocals) and Wakako Kaku (lyrics))	
Japanese Movie Critics Awards	2009	Best Film Music Artist	Departures / Ponyo	Won	
JASRAC Awards	1999	Bronze Award	Princess Mononoke	Won	
JASRAC Awards	2003	Gold Award	Spirited Away	Won	
JASRAC Awards	2007	Gold Award	Howl's Moving Castle	Won	
Korean Film Awards	2005	Best Music	Welcome to Dongmakgol	Won	
Laurence Olivier Awards	2023	Best Original Score or New Orchestrations	My Neighbour Totoro	Nominated (Note: Shared with Will Stuart (orchestrations and arrangements))	
Los Angeles Film Critics Association Awards	2005	Best Music	Howl's Moving Castle	Won (Note: Shared with Youmi Kimura)	
Mainichi Film Awards	1991	Best Music	A Scene at the Sea / Chizuko's Younger Sister	Won	
Mainichi Film Awards	1992	Best Music	Porco Rosso / Seishun Dendekedekedeke	Won	
Mainichi Film Awards	2001	Best Music	Spirited Away	Won	
Music Awards Japan	2025	Best Classical Album	A Symphonic Celebration: Music from the Studio Ghibli Films of Hayao Miyazaki	Nominated	
Music Awards Japan	2026	Best Classical Album	Joe Hisaishi Conducts	Won	
Saturn Awards	2003	Best Music	Spirited Away	Nominated	
Society of Composers & Lyricists Awards	2024	Outstanding Original Score for a Studio Film	The Boy and the Heron	Nominated	
Tokyo Anime Award	2002	Best Music	Spirited Away	Won	
Tokyo Anime Award	2005	Best Music	Howl's Moving Castle	Won	
Yokohama Film Festival	1992	Best Music	A Scene at the Sea / Chizuko's Younger Sister	Won	

== Other accolades ==
=== Guinness World Records ===
Guinness World Records achieved by Joe Hisaishi
Year	Record	Record holder	Ref.
2025	Most tickets sold by a classical composer at the Tokyo Dome (single run)	Hisaishi	
2026	Highest-selling classical run in the Hollywood Bowl	Hisaishi	
2026	Longest residency by a classical composer at Radio City Music Hall (single run)	Hisaishi	
