= Bear McCreary =

American film and television composer

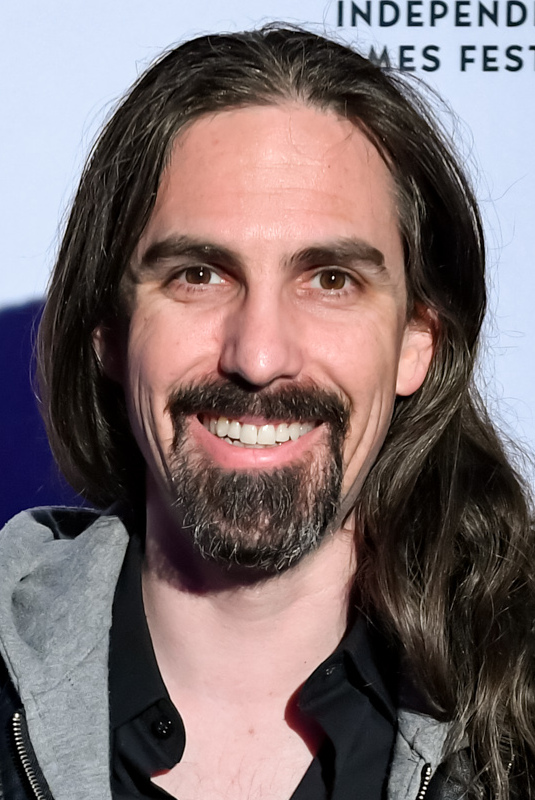
- McCreary in 2019

Background information
- Born: 1979 (age 46–47)
- Genres: Film and television scores; contemporary classical; ambient; electronic; electronic rock; hard rock; chiptune; video game score
- Occupations: Film composer; conductor; music producer; multi-instrumentalist; musician
- Instruments: Vocals; piano; keyboards; synthesizer; guitar; accordion; hurdy-gurdy; percussion
- Years active: 2004–present
- Labels: La La Land Records, Sparks & Shadows
- Spouse: Raya Yarbrough (m. 2010)
- Website: bearmccreary.com

Bear McCreary (born 1979) is an American composer of soundtracks for film, television and games.

McCreary has been nominated for six Emmy Awards, earning his first Primetime Emmy Award for Outstanding Music Composition for a Series for his work on season one of Outlander in 2015. He has won three, the first for Outstanding Original Main Title Theme Music for Da Vinci's Demons, and two Children's and Family Emmy Awards for his work on Percy Jackson and the Olympians. He is also a two-time winner of both the British Academy Games Award for Music and D.I.C.E. Award for Outstanding Achievement in Original Music Composition for his work on God of War and God of War Ragnarök, and is a four-time Grammy Award nominee.

== Early life and education ==
McCreary was raised in Bellingham, Washington. He is the son of author Laura Kalpakian and professor Jay McCreary of University of Hawaii at Manoa. His brother, Brendan McCreary, is also a musician. Bear has directed and produced several music videos for Brendan's band, Young Beautiful in a Hurry. He graduated from Bellingham High School in 1997.

He is a classically trained pianist and self-taught accordionist. He studied under the renowned film score composer Elmer Bernstein during which time he reconstructed and reorchestrated Bernstein's 1963 score for Kings of the Sun. Their collaboration allowed for the complete score to be available as a soundtrack album for the first time in 40 years.

== Career ==
=== Television ===
==== Battlestar Galactica and Caprica ====
In 2003, McCreary worked under primary composer Richard Gibbs on the three-hour miniseries which served as a pilot for the reimagined series of Battlestar Galactica. When the show was picked up, Gibbs opted not to devote full-time to the regular series' production, and McCreary became the sole composer. He worked on the series until it reached its conclusion in 2009, scoring over 70 episodes. To date, six Battlestar Galactica soundtrack albums have been released, and have garnered a great deal of critical acclaim and commercial success. The soundtracks for seasons two and three ranked amongst Amazon.com's Top 30 Music Sales on their first days of release.

McCreary composed for the Battlestar Galactica prequel series Caprica and Battlestar Galactica: Blood and Chrome.

==== Human Target ====
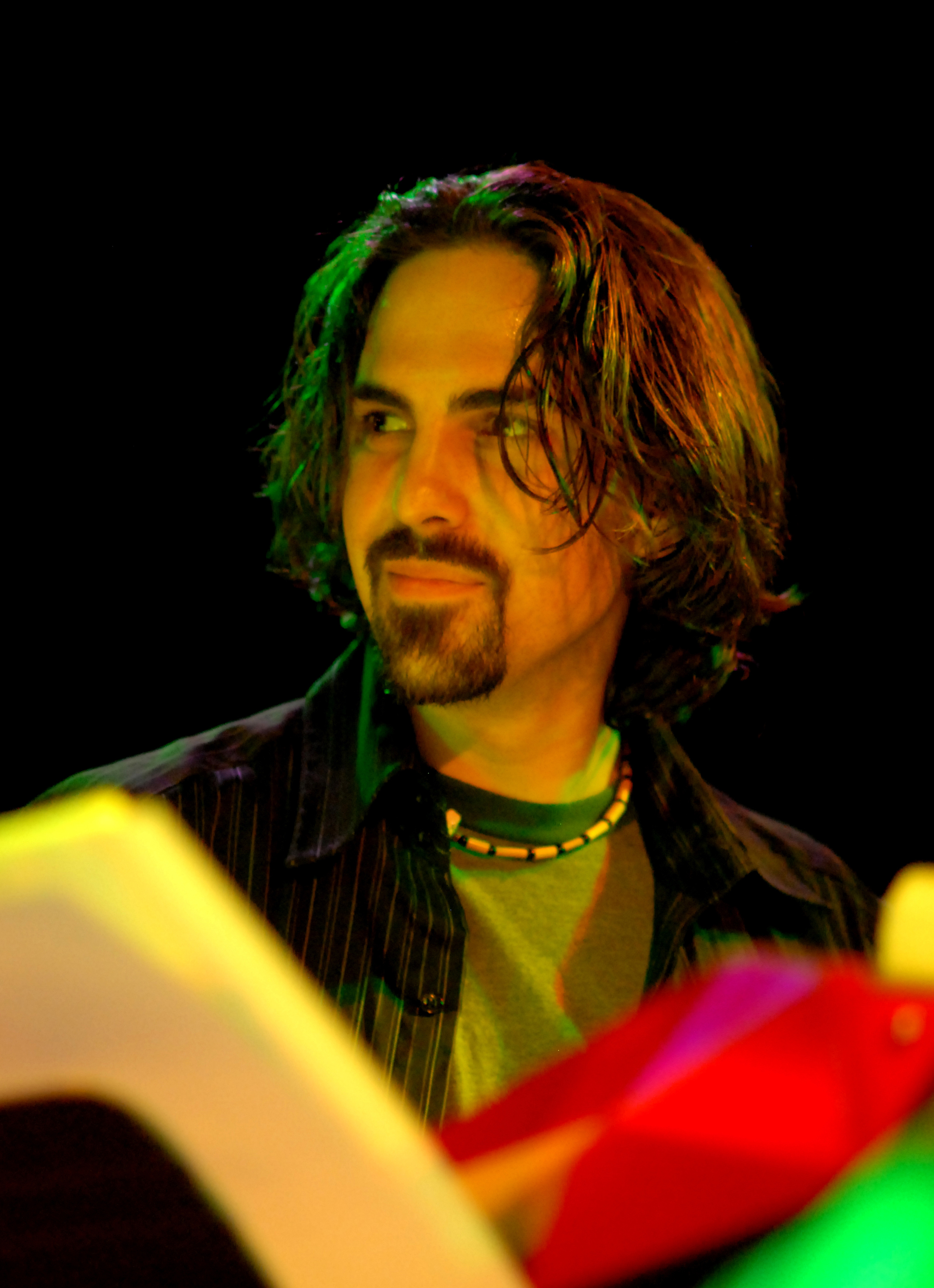
McCreary in 2009

McCreary provided the score for the series Human Target (based on the comic book of the same name). The pilot episode and main theme score had been recorded with a full orchestra. The series has the distinction of having one of the largest orchestras on television.

The score to the finale of season one, "Christopher Chance", used the largest orchestra ever assembled for episodic television, and he took the opportunity to rerecord the main title theme with a new orchestration with this larger ensemble.

In July 2010, he received his first Emmy nomination for the Human Target main title.

In a post on his blog on July 25, 2010, McCreary announced the new creative leadership brought in for season two had not asked him to return for it, and he would be leaving the series.

==== Black Sails ====
The opening title sequence for Black Sails was composed by McCreary with a backing sea shanty-inspired theme. It accurately features an instrument of the period in the form of the hurdy-gurdy.

==== Outlander ====
McCreary has composed the score for all seasons of Outlander. The main title was sung by his long-time collaborator and partner, Raya Yarbrough.

In 2015, McCreary was nominated for an Emmy for the pilot Outlander episode "Sassenach" (S01E01; 2014-08-09).

==== Other series ====
During Comic-Con 2010, Bear McCreary attended panels for AMC's The Walking Dead and NBC's The Cape to announce he would be composing the score for both television series.

On July 15, 2013, McCreary announced that he would compose the score for ABC's series Agents of S.H.I.E.L.D. On September 4, 2015, McCreary released the official Agents of S.H.I.E.L.D. soundtrack publicly.

McCreary served as orchestral producer for the rock opera Metalocalypse: The Doomstar Requiem airing on Adult Swim on October 27, 2013. This is a continuation of the Metalocalypse universe following the band Dethklok. The music features a 50-piece orchestra. The soundtrack was released on October 29, 2013.

McCreary also composed the score for the television series Snowpiercer which premiered on TNT May 17, 2020. Snowpiercer was also distributed online via Netflix.

The score for the Masters of the Universe: Revelation series on Netflix was composed by McCreary

McCreary composed the theme and music for the television series Foundation, an Apple TV+ series adapted from Isaac Asimov's novels. The Season 1 soundtrack was released on September 24, 2021.

The following year, he composed the score for the Amazon Prime Video fantasy television series The Lord of the Rings: The Rings of Power. McCreary, who wrote the score over a period of 9 months, has been a fan of J. R. R. Tolkien since reading The Hobbit aged 10. He called the job "a dream come true".

=== Films ===
McCreary worked on several films providing additional music and conducting for My Baby's Daddy and Johnson Family Vacation before striking off on his own and scoring Rest Stop and Wrong Turn 2: Dead End, both direct to video.

After working with Shawn Papazian on Rest Stop: Don't Look Back, the sequel to Rest Stop. McCreary made his theatrical film debut with Step Up 3D.

Following Step Up 3D, he scored three films directed by Joe Lynch, Chillerama, Knights of Badassdom and Everly. Everly's soundtrack included a duet McCreary sang with his wife, Raya Yarbrough.

McCreary has only worked with a few directors multiple times: Christopher Landon on three films, Happy Death Day, Happy Death Day 2U and Freaky; and director McG twice on Rim of the World and The Babysitter: Killer Queen.

Other notable film scores include Angry Video Game Nerd: The Movie, 10 Cloverfield Lane, The Cloverfield Paradox, Child's Play, and Godzilla: King of the Monsters.

McCreary's latest feature scores include Ava, The Babysitter: Killer Queen, Freaky and Paws of Fury: The Legend of Hank.

In June 2023, McCreary replaced Thomas Newman as composer for the film The Last Voyage of the Demeter, directed by André Øvredal.

=== Video games ===
McCreary made an eight-bit rendition of the Dark Void theme, which was, originally, an April fools joke. However, the theme was used for the prequel, Dark Void Zero. He composed all the songs in an eight-bit fashion by connecting the wires on an actual NES console and cartridge to create authenticity.

He arranged James Rolfe's The Angry Video Game Nerd "You're a Mean One, Mr. Grinch" parody "You're a Mean One, Mr. Nerd" for the 2010 Christmas special, with orchestra and eight-bit audio elements.

McCreary also performed with his orchestra live at Sony's E3 2016 press conference throughout the show and composed the score of the 2018 video game God of War, which shifted the God of War series to Norse mythology. He also composed the music for its 2022 sequel, God of War Ragnarök—as well as its 2023 expansion, Valhalla—for which he also plays a minor character in the game, a Dwarf named Ræb (Bear spelled backwards), who plays the Hurdy Gurdy, the same instrument Bear uses throughout the score for the game. He also returned to score the 2026 side game God of War Sons of Sparta. This game returned the series to its original Greek mythology setting, so McCreary drew from Greek folk music, using instruments such as the kithara and aulos, combining them with elements of chiptunes due to the game's retro 2D style.

In 2021, McCreary composed the score for Call of Duty: Vanguard.

=== The Singularity ===
In February 2024, McCreary announced that a concept album titled The Singularity would be released in May by Sparks & Shadows Records and Mutant. Co-written and co-produced by McCreary’s brother, Brendan McCreary, who also contributes lead vocals to eight songs, the album features performances by Rufus Wainwright, Slash, Serj Tankian, Corey Taylor, Jens Kidman, Joe Satriani, Buck Dharma, Asdru Sierra, Griogair, Kim Thayil, Scott Ian, Brendon Small, Billy Boyd, Eivør, Guthrie Govan and Bryan Beller, Mike Keneally, Ben Weinman, Steve Bartek and John Avila, Warren Fitzgerald, Esjay Jones, Sigurjón Kjartansson, Raya Yarbrough, Mega Ran, and Gene Hoglan, along with spoken-word contributions from the companion graphic novel (published by Image Comics and Black Market Narrative) by actors Lee Pace, Danai Gurira, and Ryan Hurst.

=== Theater ===
In February 2027, his musical Particle Fever will debut at La Jolla Playhouse. The book is by David Henry Hwang, with music and lyrics co-written by Zoe Sarnak and himself.

== Personal life ==
McCreary married singer and songwriter Raya Yarbrough in 2010. They have collaborated on the music of Battlestar Galactica, Outlander, Defiance, and Da Vinci's Demons, among other projects. Their daughter Sonatine, named after the musical term sonatina, was born on June 2, 2014.

== Influences ==
McCreary credits composers Jerry Goldsmith, Elmer Bernstein, Danny Elfman, Ennio Morricone, John Williams, Basil Poledouris, and Shirley Walker as being key to his growing up adoring film music. They were his heroes.

== Works ==
=== Films ===
Year	Title	Director	Distributor	Notes
2006	Rest Stop	John Shiban	Warner Bros. Home Entertainment	Direct-to-video.
2007	Wrong Turn 2: Dead End	Joe Lynch	20th Century Studios Home Entertainment	Direct-to-video; first collaboration with Lynch.
2008	Rest Stop: Don't Look Back	Shawn Papazian	Warner Bros. Home Entertainment	Direct-to-video.
2010	Step Up 3D	Jon M. Chu	Walt Disney Studios Motion Pictures	Theatrical film debut.
2011	Chillerama	Adam Rifkin, Tim Sullivan, Adam Green and Joe Lynch	Image Entertainment	Second collaboration with Lynch.
2013	Europa Report	Sebastián Cordero	Magnolia Pictures	
2013	Knights of Badassdom	Joe Lynch	Entertainment One	Third collaboration with Lynch.
2014	Angry Video Game Nerd: The Movie	Kevin Finn and James Rolfe	Indie Rights	
2014	Everly	Joe Lynch	The Weinstein Company	Fourth collaboration with Lynch.
2016	The Forest	Jason Zada	Gramercy Pictures	
2016	The Boy	William Brent Bell	STX Entertainment	
2016	10 Cloverfield Lane	Dan Trachtenberg	Paramount Pictures	First collaboration with Trachtenberg.
2016	Colossal	Nacho Vigalondo	Neon	
2017	Unrest	Jennifer Brea	Shella Films	Documentary film.
2017	Revolt	Joe Miale	Vertical Entertainment	
2017	Rebel in the Rye	Danny Strong	IFC Films	
2017	Animal Crackers	Scott Christian Sava and Tony Bancroft	Netflix	
2017	Happy Death Day	Christopher Landon	Universal Pictures	First collaboration with Landon.
2018	The Cloverfield Paradox	Julius Onah	Netflix	
2018	Tau	Federico D'Alessandro	Netflix	
2018	Hell Fest	Gregory Plotkin	Lionsgate Films	
2018	I Still See You	Scott Speer	Lionsgate Films	
2018	Welcome Home	George Ratliff	Vertical Entertainment	
2019	Happy Death Day 2U	Christopher Landon	Universal Pictures	Second collaboration with Landon.
2019	The Professor and the Madman	P. B. Shemran	Vertical Entertainment	
2019	Rim of the World	McG	Netflix	First collaboration with McG.
2019	Godzilla: King of the Monsters	Michael Dougherty	Warner Bros. Pictures	
2019	Child's Play	Lars Klevberg	United Artists Releasing	
2019	Eli	Ciarán Foy	Netflix	
2020	Crip Camp	Nicole Newnham and James LeBrecht	Netflix	Documentary film.
2020	Fantasy Island	Jeff Wadlow	Sony Pictures Releasing	
2020	Ava	Tate Taylor	Vertical Entertainment	
2020	The Babysitter: Killer Queen	McG	Netflix	Second collaboration with McG.
2020	Freaky	Christopher Landon	Universal Pictures	Third collaboration with Landon.
2022	Paws of Fury: The Legend of Hank	Rob Minkoff and Mark Koetsier	Paramount Pictures	
2023	We Have a Ghost	Christopher Landon	Netflix	Fourth collaboration with Landon.
2023	The Last Voyage of the Demeter	André Øvredal	Universal Pictures	Replaced Thomas Newman
2024	Imaginary	Jeff Wadlow	Lionsgate Films	With Sparks & Shadows
2025	Drop	Christopher Landon	Universal Pictures	Fifth collaboration with Landon.
2026	Rogue Trooper	Duncan Jones	TBA	
2026	The Devil's Mouth	Jeff Wadlow	Amazon MGM Studios	

Additional music and conducting
Year	Title	Director	Distributor	Notes
2004	My Baby's Daddy	Cheryl Dunye	Miramax Films	Film score conducted by Richard Gibbs.
2004	Johnson Family Vacation	Christopher Erskin	Fox Searchlight Pictures	Film score conducted by Richard Gibbs.

=== Television ===
Year	Title	Notes
2004–2009	Battlestar Galactica	71 episodes
2007–2012	Eureka	32 episodes
2008–2009	Terminator: The Sarah Connor Chronicles	31 episodes Terminator themes by Brad Fiedel
2009–2010	Trauma	20 episodes
2009–2010	Caprica	19 episodes
2010	Human Target	12 episodes
2010–2022	The Walking Dead	177 episodes Composed with Sam Ewing (season 10 and season 11)
2011	The Cape	10 episodes
2012	Day Break	5 episodes
2012	Holliston	17 episodes
2012	Battlestar Galactica: Blood and Chrome	10 episodes
2013	Metalocalypse: The Doomstar Requiem	Composed with Brendon Small
2013–2015	Defiance	38 episodes
2013–2015	Da Vinci's Demons	28 episodes
2013–2020	Agents of S.H.I.E.L.D.	136 episodes Composed with Jason Akers (Season 7)
2014	Intruders	8 episodes
2014	Constantine	13 episodes
2014–2017	Black Sails	38 episodes
2014–2026	Outlander	83 episodes
2016	Damien	10 episodes The Omen themes by Jerry Goldsmith
2016	Black Mirror	Episode: "Playtest"
2016–2017	Chance	20 episodes
2017–2018	Electric Dreams	3 episodes
2018	Into the Dark	Episode: "Pooka"
2019–2022	See	24 episodes
2020–2024	Snowpiercer	30 episodes
2021, 2024	Masters of the Universe: Revelation & Revolution	15 episodes
2021–present	Foundation	20 episodes With Sparks & Shadows
2022–present	The Lord of the Rings: The Rings of Power	16 episodes The Lord of the Rings: The Rings of Power main title theme by Howard Shore; See The Lord of the Rings: The Rings of Power (soundtrack)
2022	The Witcher: Blood Origin	4 episodes
2023–present	Percy Jackson and the Olympians	16 episodes With Sparks & Shadows
2024	Halo	8 episodes With Sparks & Shadows
2025–present	Outlander: Blood of My Blood	10 episodes

=== Video games ===
Year	Title	Notes
2010	Dark Void Zero	
2010	Dark Void	
2011	SOCOM 4 U.S. Navy SEALs	
2012	Moon Breakers	
2013	Defiance	
2015	Assassin's Creed Syndicate: Jack the Ripper	
2018	God of War	
2018	League of Legends	Ryze: Call of Power
2020	Star Wars: Tales From the Galaxy's Edge	With Joseph Trapanese & Danny Piccione
2021	Call of Duty: Vanguard	
2022	God of War Ragnarök	Also plays the role of Ræb
2023	Forspoken	With Garry Schyman
2023	God of War Ragnarök: Valhalla	With Sam Ewing and Omer Ben-Zvi
2024	Astro Bot	God of War themes Score by Kenneth C. M. Young
2025	Ashes of Creation	With Inon Zur
2026	March of Giants	
2026	God of War Sons of Sparta	
2027	God of War Laufey	

== Awards and nominations ==
Year	Award	Nominated work	Result
2005	International Film Music Critics Award for Best Original Score for Television	Battlestar Galactica	Nominated
2006	International Film Music Critics Award for Best Original Score for Television	Battlestar Galactica	Nominated
2007	International Film Music Critics Award for Best Original Score for Television	Battlestar Galactica	Nominated
2008	International Film Music Critics Award for Best Original Score for Television	Battlestar Galactica	Nominated
2009	ASCAP Film and Television Music Award for Top Television Series	Eureka	Won
2009	International Film Music Critics Award for Best Original Score for Television	Caprica	Nominated
2009	International Film Music Critics Award for Best Original Score for Television	Battlestar Galactica	Won
2009	The Streamy Awards for Best Original Music in a Web Series	Battlestar Galactica: The Face of the Enemy	Nominated
2010	Primetime Emmy Award for Outstanding Main Title Theme Music	Human Target	Nominated
2011	International Film Music Critics Award for Best Original Score for Television	Human Target	Won
2011	International Film Music Critics Award for Best Original Score for a Video Game or Interactive Media	Dark Void	Nominated
2011	International Film Music Critics Award for Best Original Score for a Television Series	Human Target	Won
2012	International Film Music Critics Award for Best Original Score for a Video Game or Interactive Media	SOCOM 4: U.S. Navy SEALs	Nominated
2013	ASCAP Film and Television Music Award for Top Television Series	The Walking Dead	Won
2013	International Film Music Critics Award for Best Original Score for Television	Da Vinci's Demons	Nominated
2013	Primetime Emmy Award for Outstanding Main Title Theme Music	Da Vinci's Demons	Won
2013	Online Film & Television Association for Best Music in a Series	The Walking Dead	Nominated
2014	Primetime Emmy Award for Outstanding Main Title Theme Music	Black Sails	Nominated
2014	Hollywood Music in Media Award for Best Main Title - TV Show/Digital Streaming Series	Black Sails	Nominated
2015	Primetime Emmy Award for Outstanding Music Composition for a Series	Outlander: Sassenach	Nominated
2016	International Film Music Critics Award for Best Original Score for Television	Outlander	Nominated
2016	ASCAP Film and Television Music Award for TV Composer of the Year	Agents of S.H.I.E.L.D., Black Sails, Damien, Da Vinci's Demons, Outlander, The Walking Dead	Won
2016	World Soundtrack Awards for Discovery of the Year	10 Cloverfield Lane, The Boy	Nominated
2016	World Soundtrack Awards for Television Composer of the Year	Agents of S.H.I.E.L.D., Black Sails, Damien, Da Vinci's Demons, Outlander, The Walking Dead	Nominated
2016	Hollywood Music in Media Award for Best Original Score - Sci-Fi/Fantasy Film	10 Cloverfield Lane	Nominated
2017	ASCAP Film and Television Music Award for TV Composer of the Year		Nominated
2018	The Game Awards 2018 – Best Score / Music	God of War	Nominated
2018	Hollywood Music in Media Award for Original Score — Video Game	God of War	Nominated
2019	D.I.C.E. Award for Outstanding Achievement in Original Music Composition	God of War	Won
2019	NAVGTR Awards for Best Original Dramatic Score, Franchise	God of War	Won
2019	Academy of Science Fiction, Fantasy & Horror Films, USA Saturn award for Best Music	Godzilla: King of the Monsters	Nominated
2019	International Film Music Critics Association Award for Best Original Score for a Video Game or Interactive Media	God of War	Won
2019	British Academy Games Award for Music	God of War	Won
2019	Game Audio Network Guild Best Original Choral Composition	God of War	Won
2019	Game Audio Network Guild Best Original Instrumental	God of War	Nominated
2019	Game Audio Network Guild Best Music in a Casual/Social Game	God of War	Won
2019	Game Audio Network Guild Music of the Year	God of War	Won
2019	Game Audio Network Guild Best Cinematic/Cutscene Audio	God of War	Won
2019	Etna Comics International Film Festival for Best Original Soundtrack	God of War	Nominated
2019	Reel Music Awards for Best Original Score for a Fantasy/Science Fiction/Horror Feature	Godzilla: King of the Monsters	Won
2020	Movie Music UK Awards for Composer of the Year		Won
2020	International Film Music Critics Association Award for Best Original Score for a Fantasy/Science Fiction/Horror Film	Godzilla: King of the Monsters	Nominated
2020	International Film Music Critics Association Award for Best Original Score for a Drama Film	The Professor and the Madman	Nominated
2020	International Film Music Critics Association Award for Film Composer of the Year		Won
2021	International Film Music Critics Association Award for Film Composer of the Year		Nominated
2021	International Film Music Critics Association Award for Best Original Score for an Animated Film	Animal Crackers	Nominated
2022	International Film Music Critics Association Award for Best Original Score for a Video Game or Interactive Media	Call of Duty Vanguard	Nominated
2022	International Film Music Critics Association Award for Best Original Score for a Television Series	Foundation	Nominated
2022	International Film Music Critics Association Award for Best Original Score for a Television Series	Masters of the Universe: Revelation	Won
2022	BloodGuts UK Horror Awards for Best Soundtrack/Score	Freaky	Nominated
2022	The Game Awards 2022 – Best Score and Music	God of War Ragnarök	Won
2022	Hollywood Music in Media Award for Original Song — Video Game	God of War Ragnarök ("Blood Upon The Snow")	Won
2022	Hollywood Music in Media Award for Original Score — Video Game	God of War Ragnarök	Nominated
2022	Hollywood Music in Media Award for Original Score — TV Show/Limited Series	The Lord of the Rings: The Rings of Power	Nominated
2022	Reel Music Awards for Overall Score of the Year	The Lord of the Rings: The Rings of Power	Won
2022	Reel Music Awards for Original Score for a Television Series	The Lord of the Rings: The Rings of Power	Won
2022	Game Audio Network Guild Best Main Theme	Call of Duty Vanguard	Nominated
2022	Game Audio Network Guild Best Cinematic & Cutscene Audio	Call of Duty Vanguard	Nominated
2022	Game Audio Network Guild Best Physical Soundtrack Release	Call of Duty Vanguard	Nominated
2023	Grammy Award for Best Score Soundtrack for Video Games and Other Interactive Media	Call of Duty: Vanguard	Nominated
2023	D.I.C.E. Award for Outstanding Achievement in Original Music Composition	God of War Ragnarök	Won
2023	British Academy Games Award for Music	God of War Ragnarök	Won
2023	NAVGTR Awards for Best Original Dramatic Score, Franchise	God of War Ragnarök	Nominated
2023	NAVGTR Awards for Best Song, Original or Adapted	God of War Ragnarök	Nominated
2023	Game Audio Network Guild Music of the Year	God of War Ragnarök	Won
2023	Game Audio Network Guild Best Original Song	God of War Ragnarök ("Blood Upon the Snow")	Won
2023	Game Audio Network Guild Best Main Theme	God of War Ragnarök ("God of War Ragnarök")	Won
2023	Game Audio Network Guild Best Original Soundtrack Album	God of War Ragnarök	Won
2023	Game Audio Network Guild Creative and Technical Achievement in Music	God of War Ragnarök	Won
2023	Game Audio Network Guild Best Cinematic/Cutscene Audio	God of War Ragnarök	Won
2023	International Film Music Critics Association Award for Best Original Score for a Video Game or Interactive Media	God of War Ragnarök	Won
2023	International Film Music Critics Association Awards for Score of the Year	The Lord of the Rings: The Rings of Power	Won
2023	International Film Music Critics Association Awards for Composer of the Year	The Lord of the Rings: The Rings of Power	Won
2023	International Film Music Critics Association Awards for Composition of the Year	The Lord of the Rings: The Rings of Power ("Galadriel")	Nominated
2023	International Film Music Critics Association Awards for Best Original Score for an Animated Film	Paws of Fury: The Legend of Hank	Nominated
2023	International Film Music Critics Association Awards for Composition of the Year	The Lord of the Rings: The Rings of Power ("Númenor")	Nominated
2023	International Film Music Critics Association Awards for Composition of the Year	The Lord of the Rings: The Rings of Power ("Sailing Into the Dawn")	Nominated
2023	International Film Music Critics Association Award for Best Original Score for Television	The Lord of the Rings: The Rings of Power	Won
2023	Society of Composers & Lyricists Awards for Outstanding Score For Television	The Lord of the Rings: The Rings of Power	Nominated
2023	Society of Composers & Lyricists Awards for Outstanding Original Score for Interactive Media	God of War Ragnarök	Nominated
2023	ASCAP Composers' Choice Award for Television Score of the Year	The Lord of the Rings: The Rings of Power	Nominated
2023	ASCAP Composers' Choice Award for Video Game Score of the Year	God of War Ragnarök	Won
2023	Hollywood Music in Media Award for Best Main Title Theme – TV Show/Limited Series	Percy Jackson and the Olympians	Nominated
2023	Movie Music UK Awards for Score of the Year	The Lord of the Rings: The Rings of Power	Won
2023	Movie Music UK Awards for Best Original Score for Television	The Lord of the Rings: The Rings of Power	Won
2023	Movie Music UK Awards for Composer of the Year		Nominated
2024	Grammy Award for Best Score Soundtrack for Video Games and Other Interactive Media	God of War Ragnarök	Nominated
2024	Grammy Award for Best Immersive Audio Album	God of War Ragnarök (Original Soundtrack)	Nominated
2024	International Film Music Critics Association Award for Best Original Score for a Video Game or Interactive Media	God of War Ragnarök: Valhalla	Nominated
2024	International Film Music Critics Association Award for Best Original Score for a Horror/Thriller Film	The Last Voyage of the Demeter	Nominated
2024	International Film Music Critics Association Awards for Composer of the Year		Nominated
2024	Children's and Family Emmy Award for Outstanding Music Direction and Composition for a Live Action Program	Percy Jackson and the Olympians: Season 1	Won
2024	Children's and Family Emmy Award for Outstanding Show Open	Percy Jackson and the Olympians: Season 1	Won
2025	Grammy Award for Best Score Soundtrack for Video Games and Other Interactive Media	God of War Ragnarök: Valhalla	Nominated
