= International Film Music Critics Association Award for Film Composer of the Year =

International fim music award

The International Film Music Critics Association Award for Film Composer of the Year is an annual award given by the International Film Music Critics Association, or the IFMCA. The award is given to the composer of a film score or score deemed to be the best in a given year. The award was first given in 1998 till 2000, before going a four-year hiatus. It has been awards every year since 2004.

== Winners and nominations ==
=== 1990s ===
Year	Composer(s)
1998	Jerry Goldsmith
1998	George Fenton
1998	James Horner
1998	Joel McNeely
1998	John Williams
1999	Jerry Goldsmith
1999	John Corigliano
1999	Mychael Danna
1999	Don Davis
1999	John Debney
1999	Danny Elfman
1999	George Fenton
1999	James Newton Howard
1999	Michael Kamen
1999	Thomas Newman
1999	John Williams

=== 2000s ===
Year	Composer(s)
2000	James Newton Howard
2000	Jerry Goldsmith
2000	James Horner
2000	Ennio Morricone
2000	Thomas Newman
2000	Rachel Portman
2000	Howard Shore
2000	Alan Silvestri
2000	Christopher Young
2000	Hans Zimmer
2004	Michael Giacchino
2004	Marco Beltrami
2004	Edward Shearmur
2004	Alan Silvestri
2004	John Williams
2005	John Williams
2005	Alexandre Desplat
2005	Patrick Doyle
2005	Harry Gregson-Williams
2005	Dario Marianelli
2006	Alexandre Desplat
2006	James Newton Howard
2006	Mark Isham
2006	John Powell
2006	Hans Zimmer
2007	Alexandre Desplat
2007	Michael Giacchino
2007	James Newton Howard
2007	Mark Isham
2007	Dario Marianelli
2008	Danny Elfman
2008	Alexandre Desplat
2008	James Newton Howard
2008	Thomas Newman
2008	John Powell
2009	Michael Giacchino
2009	Alexandre Desplat
2009	James Horner
2009	Brian Tyler
2009	Christopher Young

=== 2010s ===
Year	Composer(s)
2010	Alexandre Desplat
2010	Danny Elfman
2010	James Newton Howard
2010	John Powell
2010	Hans Zimmer
2011	John Williams
2011	Ludovic Bource
2011	Alexandre Desplat
2011	Michael Giacchino
2011	Alberto Iglesias
2012	Danny Elfman
2012	Mychael Danna
2012	Alexandre Desplat
2012	Fernando Velázquez
2012	John Williams
2013	Abel Korzeniowski
2013	Roque Baños
2013	Laurent Eyquem
2013	Steven Price
2013	Brian Tyler
2014	Alexandre Desplat
2014	Marco Beltrami
2014	James Newton Howard
2014	John Powell
2014	Hans Zimmer
2015	Michael Giacchino
2015	James Horner
2015	Ennio Morricone
2015	Daniel Pemberton
2015	John Williams
2016	Michael Giacchino
2016	Alexandre Desplat
2016	Justin Hurwitz
2016	James Newton Howard
2016	Fernando Velázquez
2017	Alexandre Desplat
2017	Michael Giacchino
2017	Daniel Pemberton
2017	Benjamin Wallfisch
2017	John Williams
2018	James Newton Howard
2018	Roque Baños
2018	Nicholas Britell
2018	Ludwig Göransson
2018	Alan Silvestri
2019	Bear McCreary
2019	Alexandre Desplat
2019	Hildur Guðnadóttir
2019	Thomas Newman
2019	John Williams

=== 2020s ===
Year	Composer(s)
2020	Daniel Pemberton
2020	Federico Jusid
2020	Bear McCreary
2020	Christopher Willis
2020	Hans Zimmer
2021	James Newton Howard
2021	Panu Aaltio
2021	Nicholas Britell
2021	Jonny Greenwood
2021	Hans Zimmer
2022	Bear McCreary
2022	Alexandre Desplat
2022	Simon Franglen
2022	Michael Giacchino
2022	Daniel Pemberton
2023	Christopher Young
2023	Lorne Balfe
2023	Laura Karpman
2023	Bear McCreary
2023	John Williams
