= International Film Music Critics Association Award for Best Original Score for a Video Game or Interactive Media =

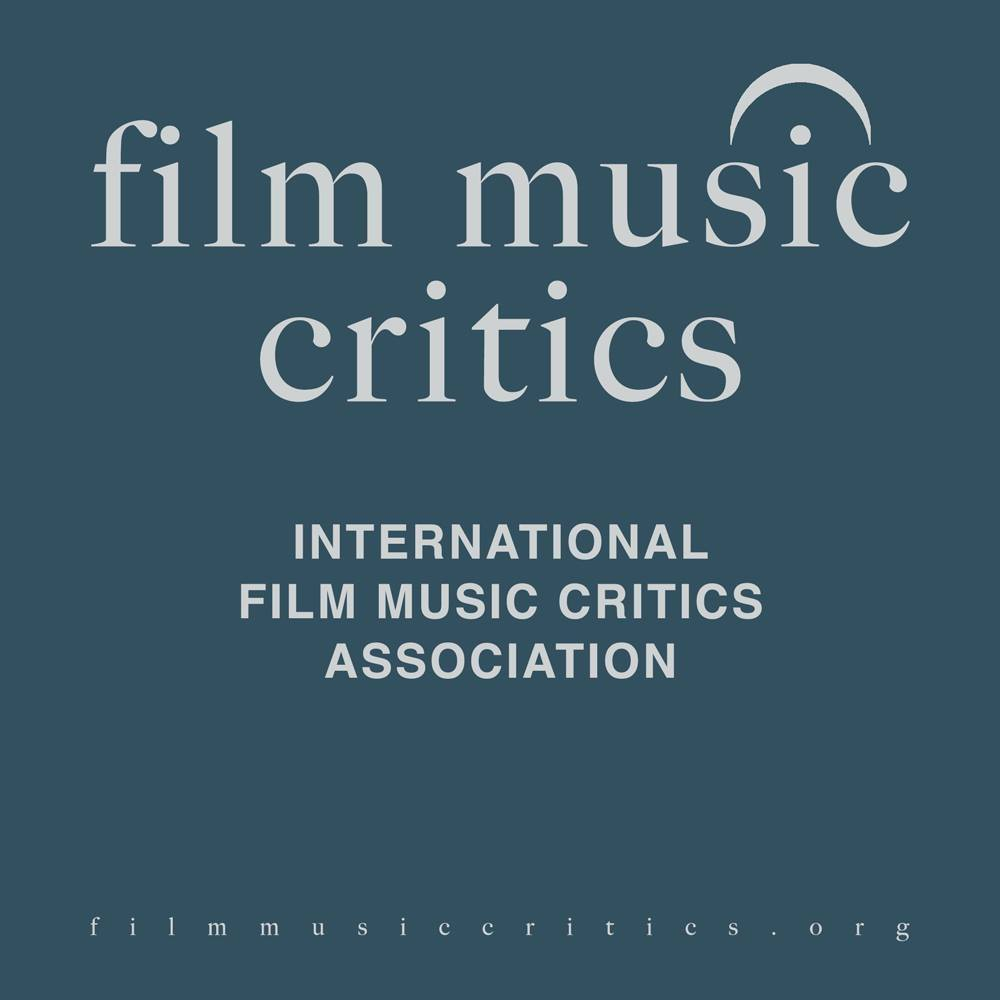
- International Film Music Critics Association logo
- First award: 2007

Highlights
- Most wins: Austin Wintory
- Most nominations: Austin Wintory

The International Film Music Critics Association Award for Best Original Score for a Video Game or Interactive Media is an annual award given by the International Film Music Critics Association (IFMCA). Established in 2007, the award is given to the composer of a video game score based on two criteria: "the effectiveness, appropriateness and emotional impact of the score in the context of the film for which it was written; and the technical and intellectual merit of the composition when heard as a standalone listening experience." The eligibility period runs 1 January through 31 December every year, and IFMCA members vote for the winner the following February.

As of 2025, 71 composers and one band have been nominated for the International Film Music Critics Association Award for Best Original Score for a Video Game or Interactive Media. The first award was given to John Debney for his work on the video game Lair. The most recent recipients was Gordy Haab for his work on the video game Indiana Jones and the Great Circle. Austin Wintory has been nominated eight times and won three; he is the only composer to have been nominated twice in the same year, which happened in 2016. Bear McCreary was nominated six times, while Olivier Deriviere and Neal Acree were each nominated five.

== Winners and nominees ==
In the tables below, winners are marked by a light green background and a double-dagger symbol (‡).

=== 2000s ===
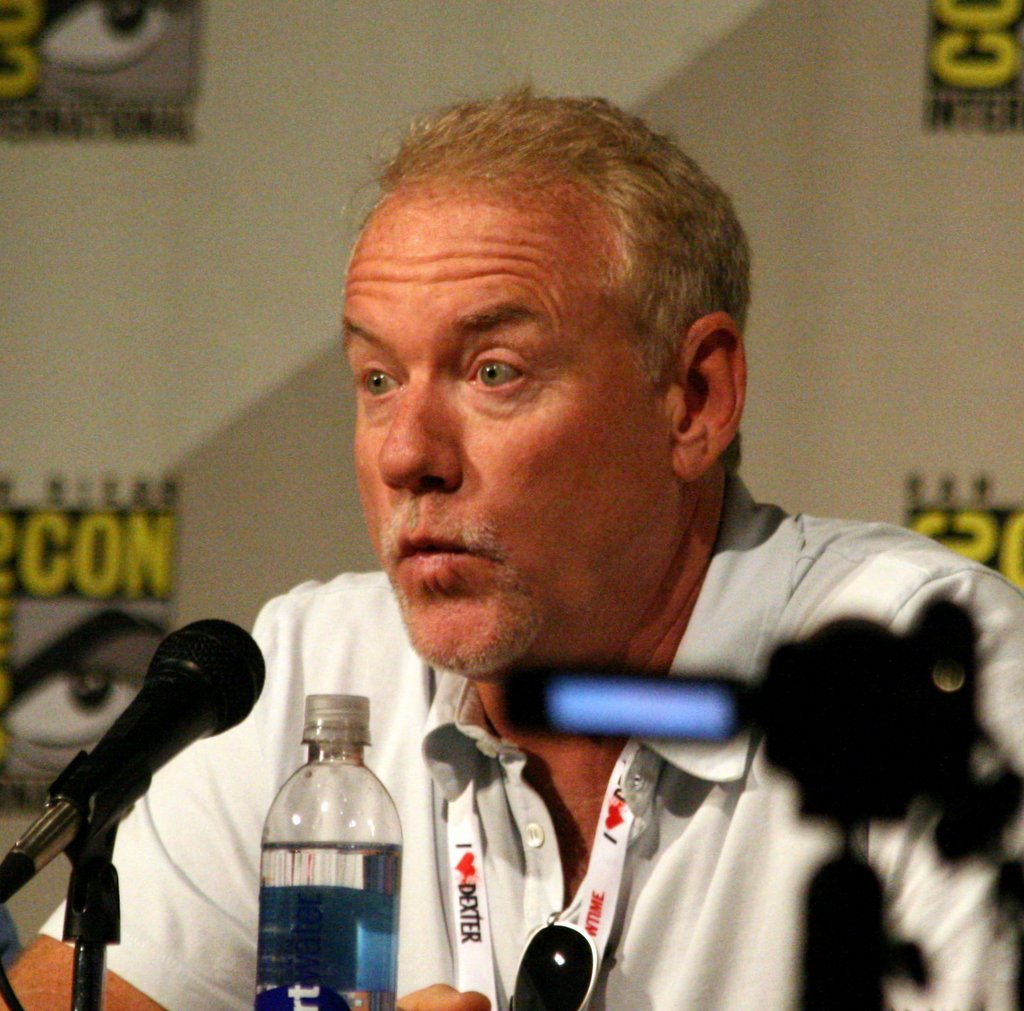
John Debney (pictured in 2013) was the 2007 winner

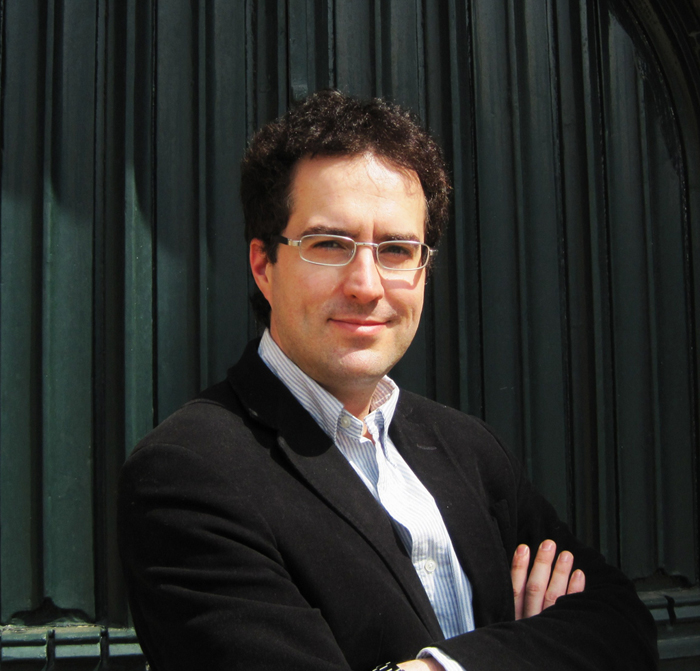
James Hannigan (pictured in 2010) was the 2009 winner

Awards in the 2000s
Year	Game/Interactive Media	Composer(s)	Compan(y/ies)	Ref.
2007	Lair‡	John Debney	Sony Computer Entertainment	
2007	BioShock	Garry Schyman	2K Games	
2007	Call of Duty 4: Modern Warfare	Stephen Barton; Harry Gregson-Williams (theme music)	Activision	
2007	Medal of Honor: Airborne	Michael Giacchino	EA	
2007	Warhawk	Christopher Lennertz; Tim Wynn	Sony Computer Entertainment	
2008	Age of Conan: Hyborian Adventures‡	Knut Avenstroup Haugen	Funcom; Eidos Interactive	
2008	Afrika	Wataru Hokoyama	Sony Computer Entertainment (Japan); Natsume Inc. (North American)	
2008	Gears of War 2	Steve Jablonsky	Microsoft Game Studios	
2008	Mercenaries 2: World in Flames	Chris Tilton	EA	
2008	Star Wars: The Force Unleashed	Mark Griskey	LucasArts	
2009	Harry Potter and the Half-Blood Prince‡	James Hannigan	EA	
2009	Assassin's Creed II	Jesper Kyd	Ubisoft	
2009	Call of Duty: Modern Warfare 2	Lorne Balfe; Hans Zimmer (theme music)	Activision	
2009	Night at the Museum: Battle of the Smithsonian	Chris Tilton	Majesco	
2009	Spore Hero	Winifred Phillips	EA	

=== 2010s ===
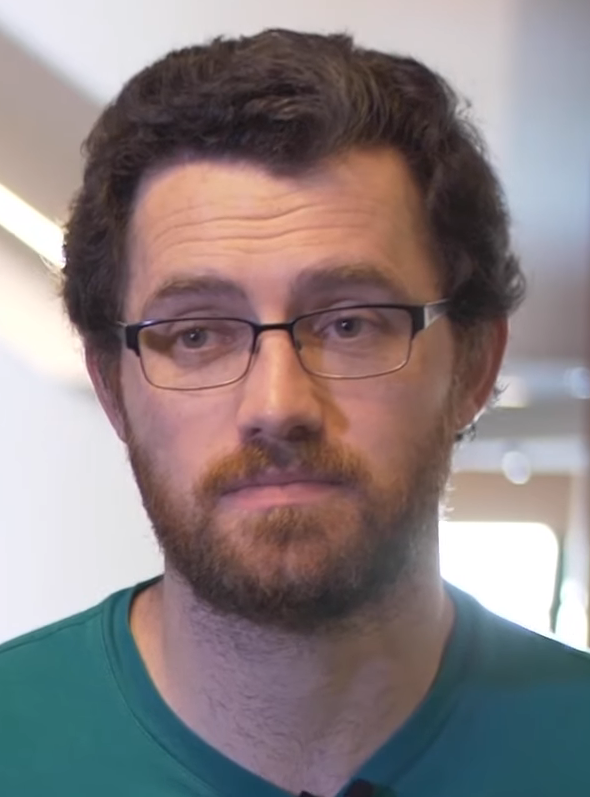
Austin Wintory (pictured in 2019) was the 2012, 2015, and 2016 winner

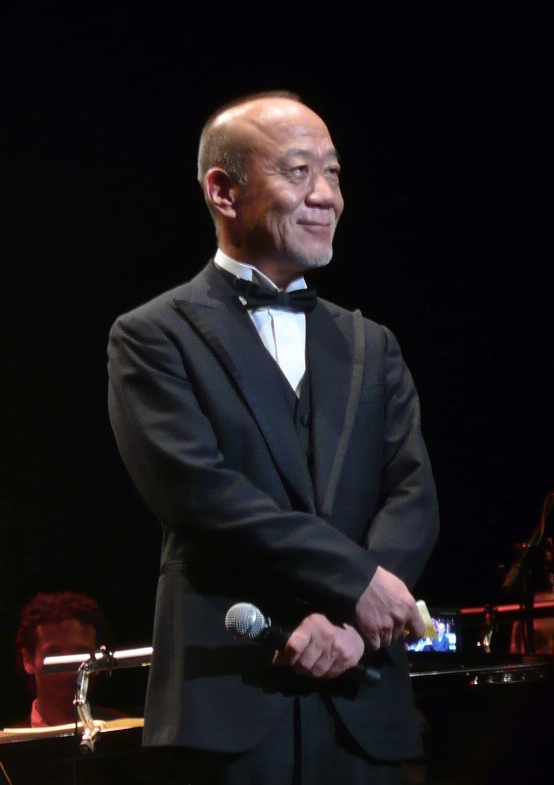
Joe Hisaishi (pictured in 2011) was the 2011 winner and a 2018 nominee

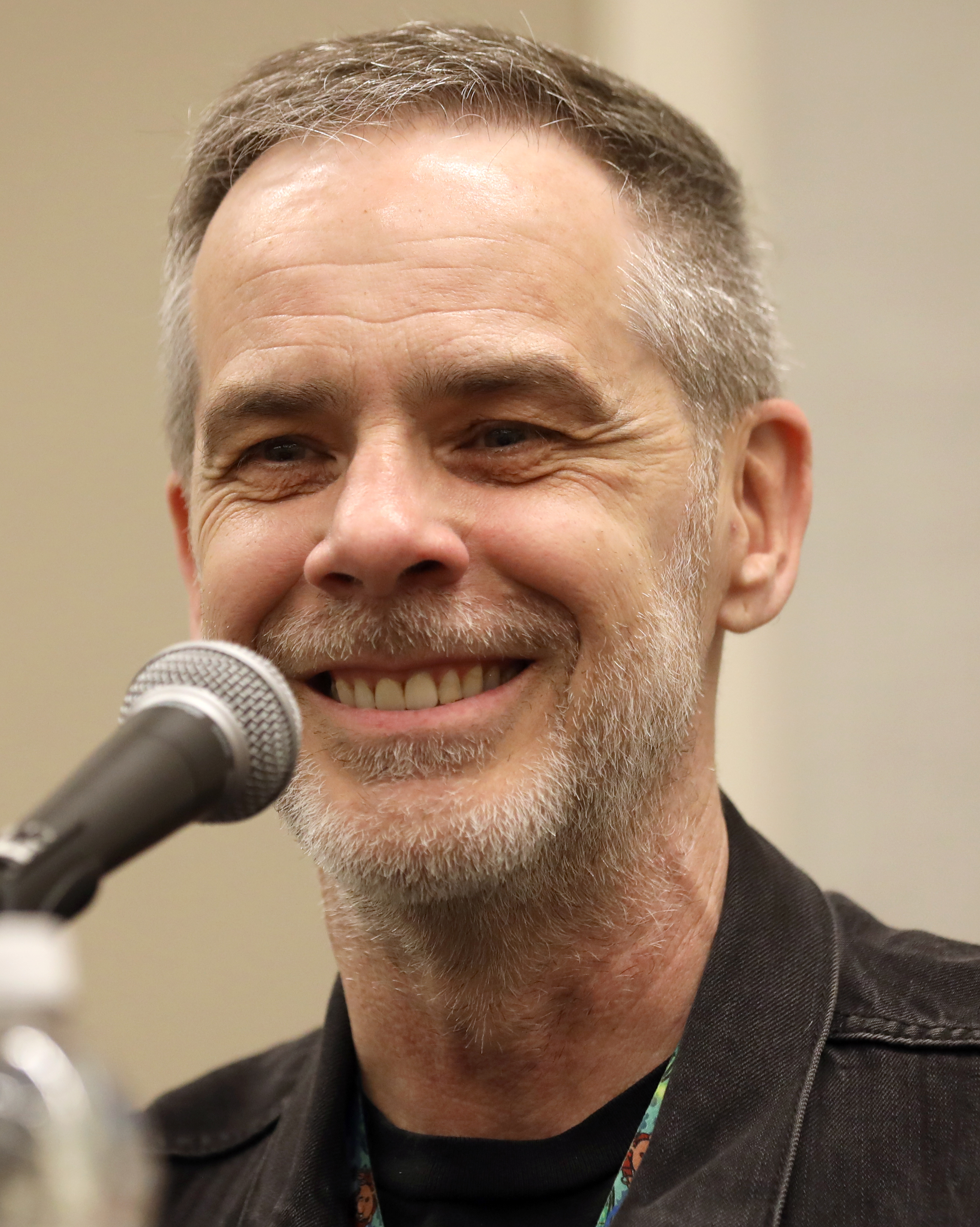
Grant Kirkhope (pictured in 2024) was the 2014 winner

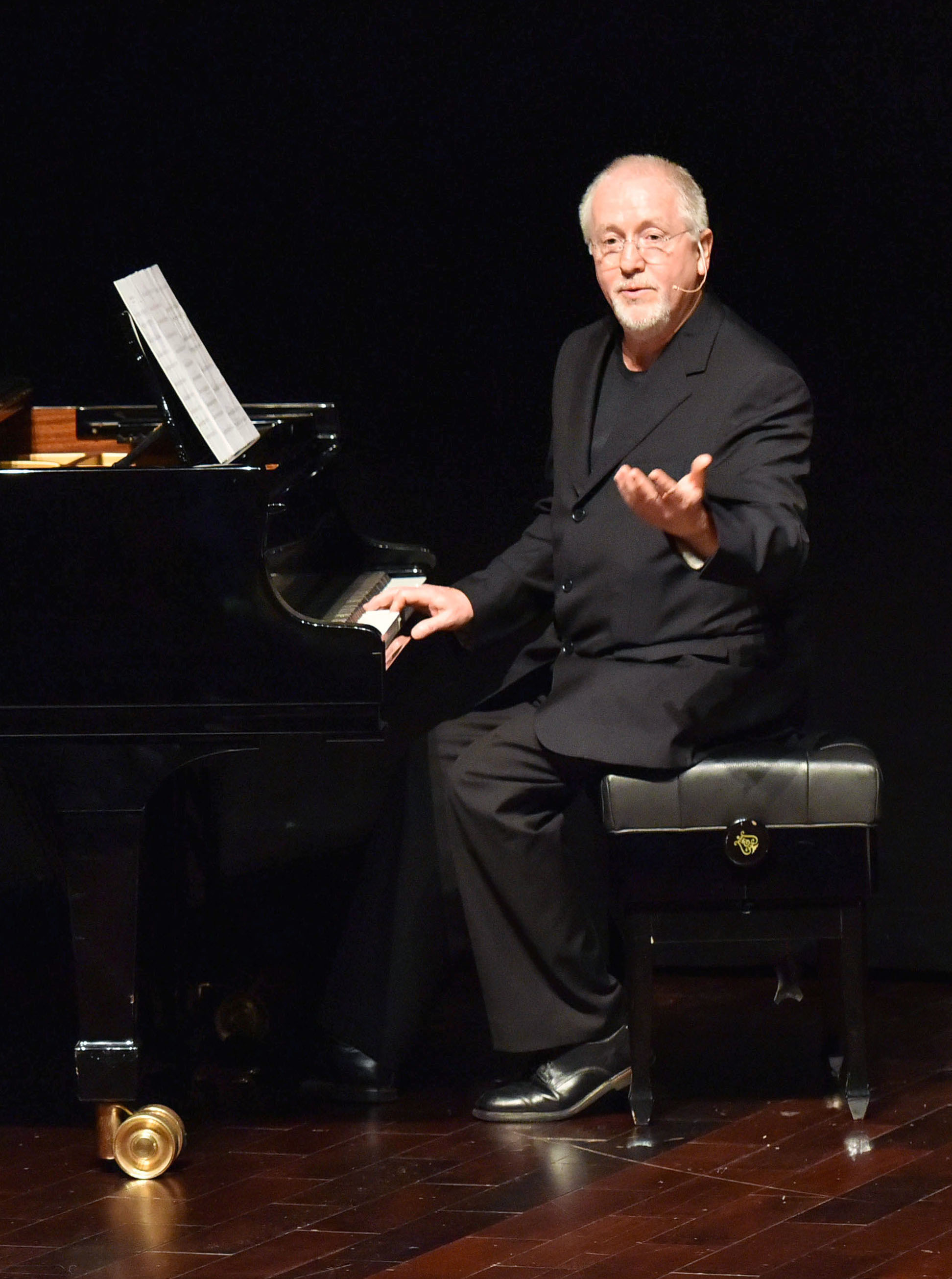
Patrick Doyle (pictured in 2016) was a 2013 nominee

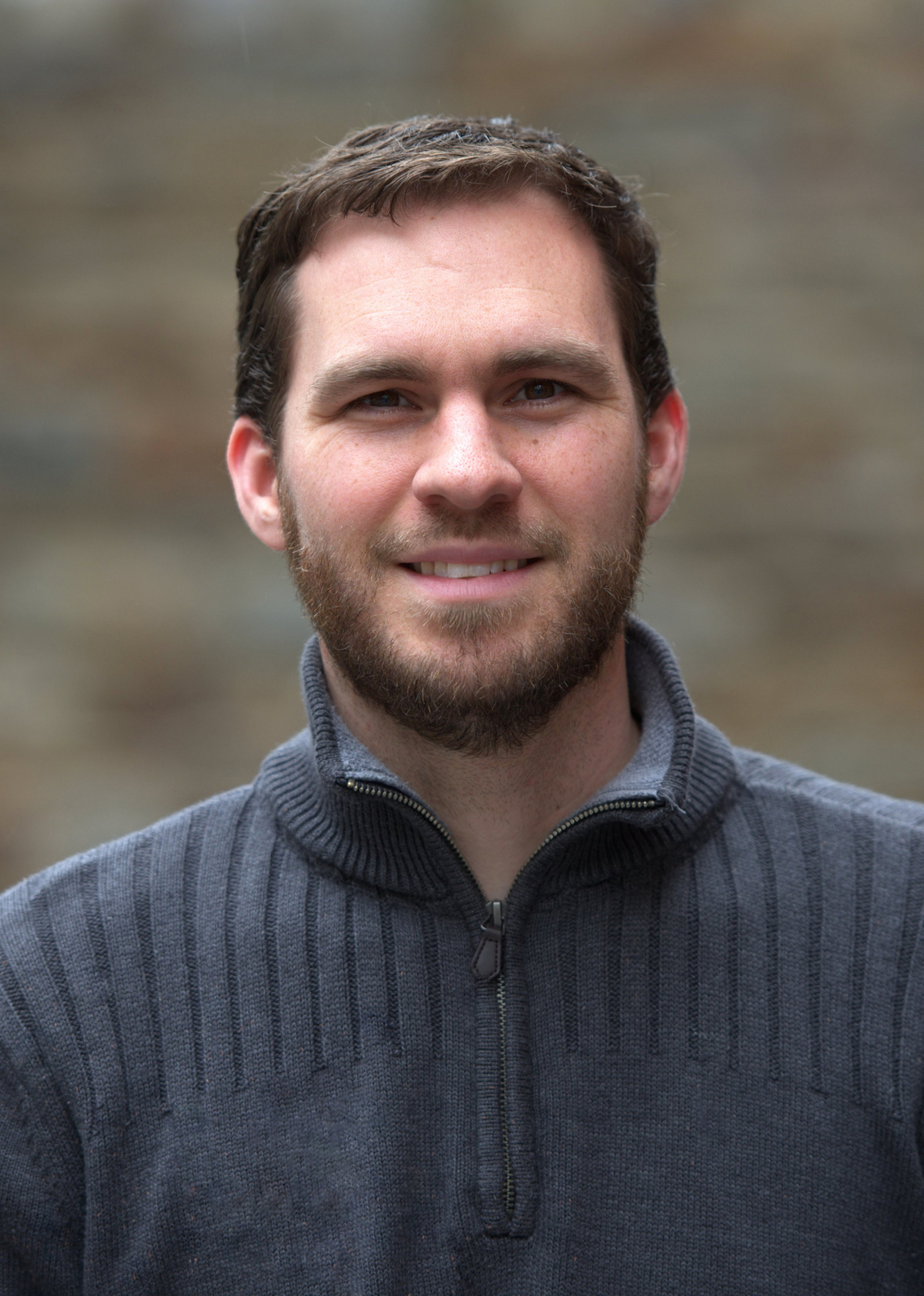
Geoff Knorr (pictured in 2017) was a 2014 winner and 2015 nominee

Awards in the 2010s
Year	Game/Interactive Media	Composer(s)	Compan(y/ies)	Ref.
2010	Castlevania: Lords of Shadow‡	Óscar Araujo	Konami	
2010	Dark Void	Bear McCreary	Capcom	
2010	James Bond 007: Blood Stone	Richard Jacques	Activision	
2010	Legend of the Guardians: The Owls of Ga’hoole	Winifred Phillips	WB Games	
2010	Lego Universe	Brian Tyler	The Lego Group	
2011	Ni no Kuni: Wrath of the White Witch‡	Joe Hisaishi	Level-5 (company) (Japan); Bandai Namco Entertainment	
2011	Call of Duty: Modern Warfare 3	Brian Tyler	Activision	
2011	The Elder Scrolls V: Skyrim	Jeremy Soule	Bethesda Softworks	
2011	L.A. Noire	Andrew Hale; Simon Hale	Rockstar Games	
2011	SOCOM 4 U.S. Navy SEALs	Bear McCreary	Sony Computer Entertainment	
2012	Journey‡	Austin Wintory	Sony Computer Entertainment; Annapurna Interactive (PC, iOS)	
2012	Kingdoms of Amalur: Reckoning	Grant Kirkhope	38 Studios; EA	
2012	Resistance: Burning Skies	Jason Graves; Kevin Riepl	Sony Computer Entertainment	
2012	Starhawk	Christopher Lennertz	Sony Computer Entertainment	
2012	World of Warcraft: Mists of Pandaria	Neal Acree; Russell Brower; Sam Cardon; Edo Guidotti; Jeremy Soule	Blizzard Entertainment	
2013	Remember Me‡	Olivier Deriviere	Capcom	
2013	Assassin's Creed IV: Black Flag	Brian Tyler	Ubisoft	
2013	Beyond: Two Souls	Lorne Balfe	Sony Computer Entertainment; Quantic Dream (PC)	
2013	Company of Heroes 2	Cris Velasco	Sega; Feral Interactive (macOS, Linux)	
2013	Puppeteer	Patrick Doyle	Sony Computer Entertainment	
2014	Civilization: Beyond Earth‡	Griffin Cohen; Michael Curren; Grant Kirkhope; Geoff Knorr	2K Games; Aspyr (macOS, Linux)	
2014	Assassin's Creed Unity	Chris Tilton; Sarah Schachner	Ubisoft	
2014	The Banner Saga	Austin Wintory	Versus Evil	
2014	Castlevania: Lords of Shadow 2	Óscar Araujo	Konami	
2014	World of Warcraft: Warlords of Draenor	Neal Acree; Clint Bajakian; Russell Brower; Sam Cardon; Craig Stuart Garfinkle; Edo Guidotti; Eímear Noone	Blizzard Entertainment	
2015	Assassin's Creed Syndicate‡	Austin Wintory	Ubisoft	
2015	Civilization: Beyond Earth – Rising Tide	Griffin Cohen; Grant Kirkhope; Geoff Knorr	2K Games; Aspyr (macOS, Linux)	
2015	Everybody's Gone to the Rapture	Jessica Curry	Sony Computer Entertainment	
2015	Ori and the Blind Forest	Gareth Coker	Moon Studios	
2015	Revelation	Neal Acree	NetEase	
2016	Abzû‡	Austin Wintory	505 Games	
2016	The Banner Saga 2	Austin Wintory	Versus Evil	
2016	The Dwarves	Benny Oschmann	THQ Nordic	
2016	The Last Guardian	Takeshi Furukawa	SIE	
2016	ReCore	Chad Seiter	Microsoft Studios	
2017	Rime‡	David García Díaz	Grey Box; Six Foot	
2017	Deformers	Austin Wintory	GameTrust	
2017	Divide	Chris Tilton	—N/a	
2017	Get Even	Olivier Deriviere	Bandai Namco Entertainment	
2017	Valkyria Revolution	Yasunori Mitsuda	Sega (North America, Japan); Deep Silver (PAL region)	
2018	God of War‡	Bear McCreary	Sony Interactive Entertainment	
2018	11-11: Memories Retold	Olivier Deriviere	Bandai Namco Entertainment	
2018	Ni no Kuni II: Revenant Kingdom	Joe Hisaishi	Level-5 (company) (Japan); Bandai Namco Entertainment	
2018	Spider-Man	John Paesano	Sony Interactive Entertainment	
2018	Torn	Garry Schyman	Aspyr	
2019	Rend‡	Neal Acree	Frostkeep Studios	
2019	Days Gone	Nathan Whitehead	Sony Interactive Entertainment	
2019	Erica	Austin Wintory	Flavourworks	
2019	A Plague Tale: Innocence	Olivier Deriviere	Focus Home Interactive	
2019	Star Wars Jedi: Fallen Order	Stephen Barton; Gordy Haab	EA	

=== 2020s ===
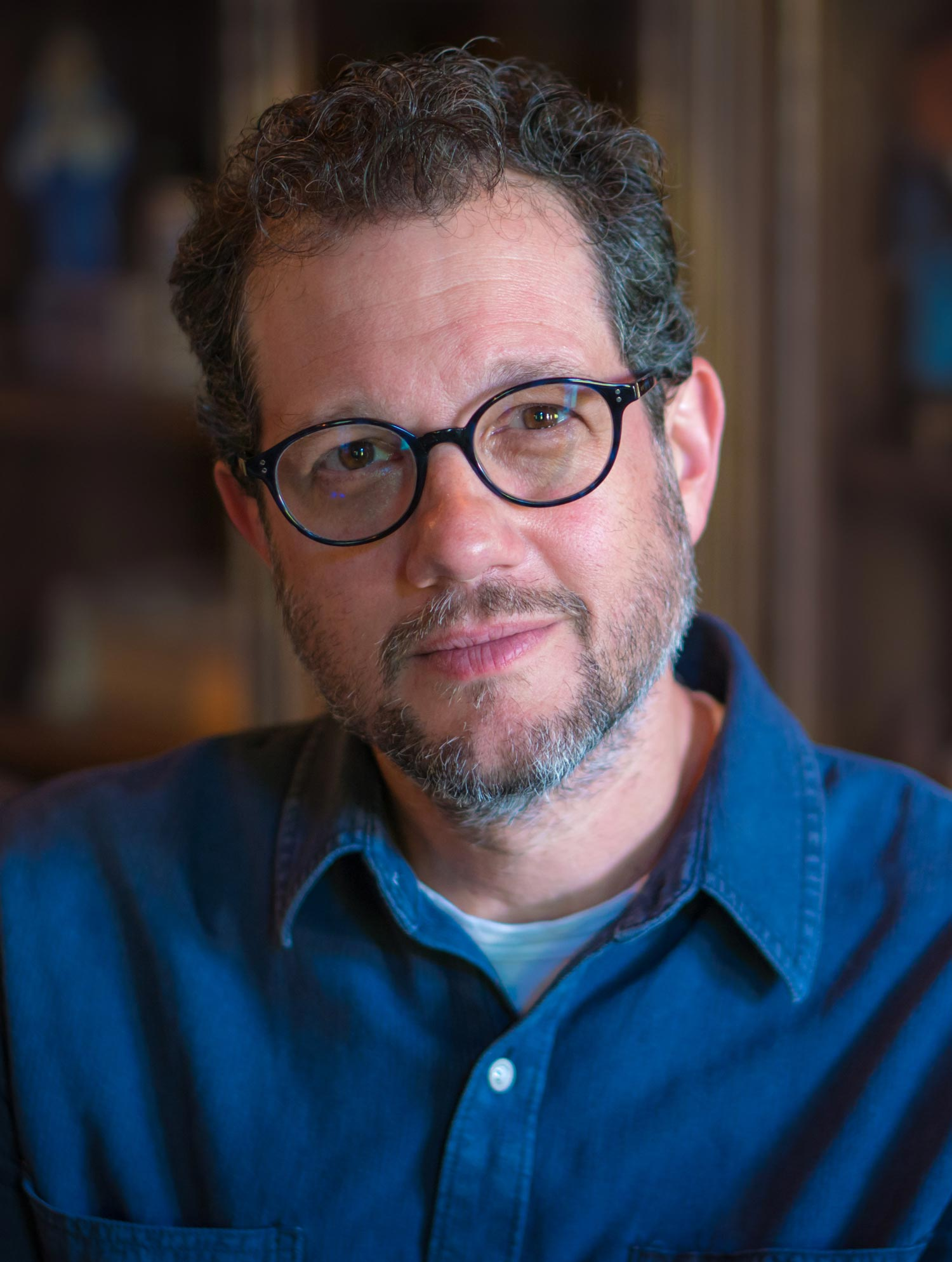
Michael Giacchiano (pictured in 2017) was a 2020 winner and a 2007 nominee

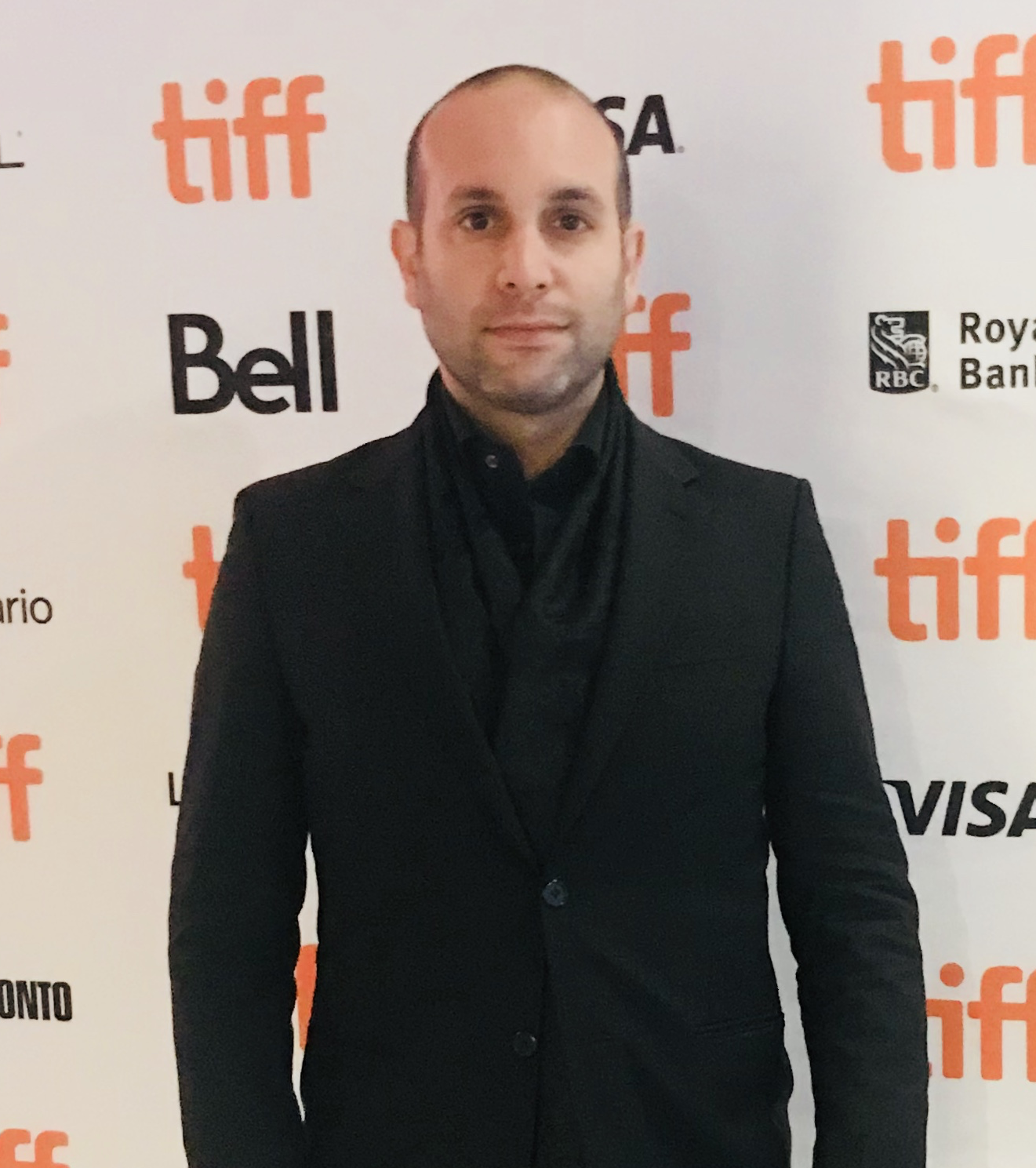
Ilan Eshkeri (pictured in 2018) was a 2020 and a 2021 nominee

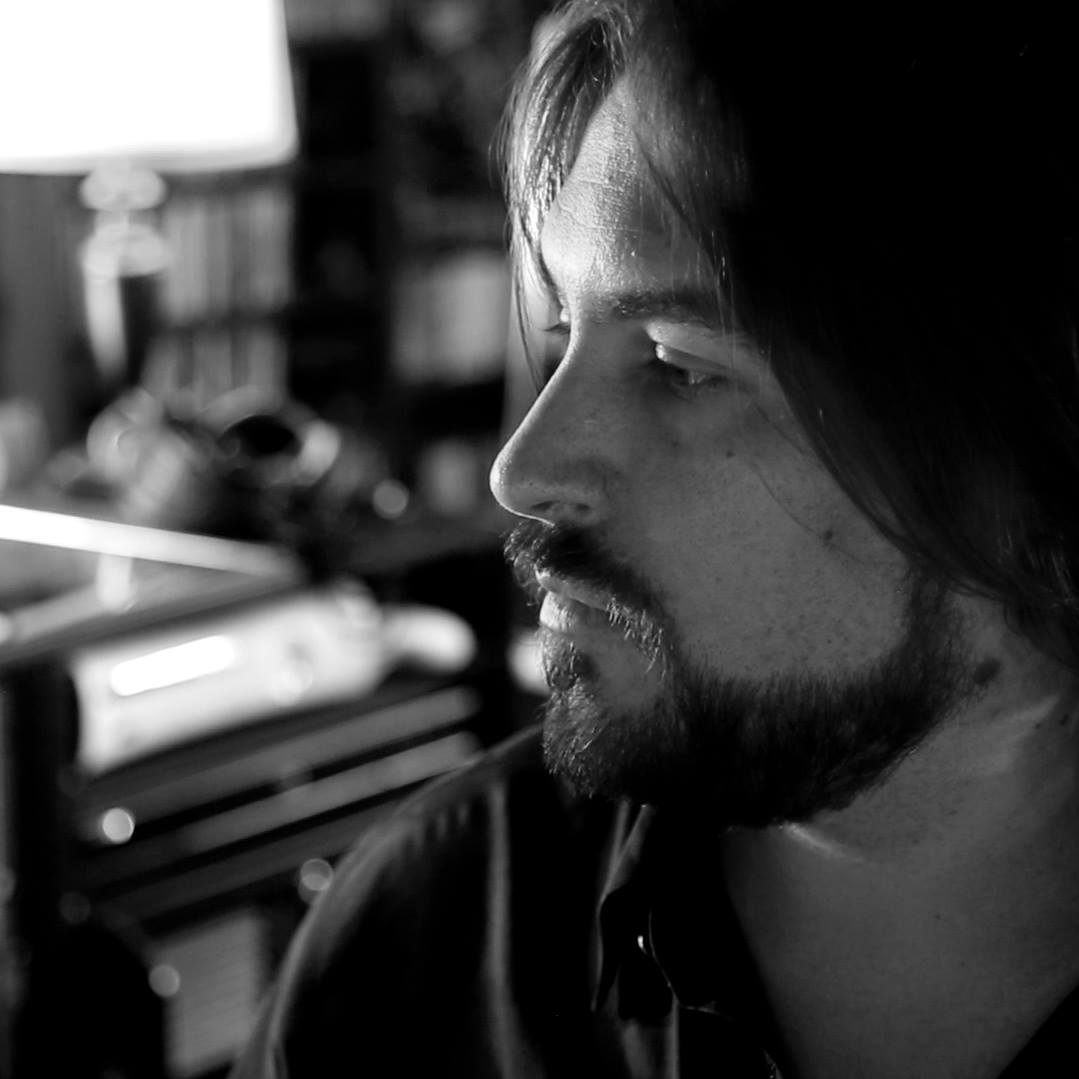
Neal Acree (pictured in 2015) was the 2019 and a 2023 winner

Awards in the 2020s
Year	Game/Interactive Media	Composer(s)	Companies	Ref.
2020	Medal of Honor: Above and Beyond‡	Michael Giacchino; Nami Melumad	Respawn Entertainment; EA	
2020	Ghost of Tsushima	Ilan Eshkeri; Shigeru Umebayashi	Sucker Punch Productions; Sony Interactive Entertainment	
2020	Ori and the Will of the Wisps	Gareth Coker	Moon Studios; Xbox Game Studios	
2020	The Pathless	Austin Wintory	Giant Squid; Annapurna Interactive	
2020	Star Wars: Squadrons	Gordy Haab	Motive Studios; EA	
2021	Ratchet & Clank: Rift Apart‡	Mark Mothersbaugh; Wataru Hokoyama	Insomniac Games; Sony Interactive Entertainment	
2021	Ark: Genesis part II	Gareth Coker	Studio Wildcard	
2021	Call of Duty: Vanguard	Bear McCreary	Sledgehammer Games; Activision	
2021	Ghost of Tsushima: Iki Island & Legends	Chad Cannon; Bill Hemstapat; Ilan Eshkeri (theme music)	Sucker Punch Productions; Sony Interactive Entertainment	
2021	Marvel's Guardians of the Galaxy	Richard Jacques	Eidos-Montréal; Square Enix	
2022	God of War Ragnarök‡	Bear McCreary	Santa Monica Studio; Sony Interactive Entertainment	
2022	Cat Burglar	Christopher Willis	Netflix	
2022	The Faith of the Three Kingdoms	Shigeru Umebayashi; Chad Cannon	Ice Bird Studio	
2022	Mario + Rabbids Sparks of Hope	Yōko Shimomura; Grant Kirkhope; Gareth Coker	Ubisoft Milan; Ubisoft Paris; Ubisoft	
2022	A Plague Tale: Requiem	Olivier Derivière	Asobo Studio; Focus Entertainment	
2023	Avatar: Frontiers of Pandora‡	Pinar Toprak; Neal Acree	Massive Entertainment; Ubisoft	
2023	God of War Ragnarök (Valhalla)	Sparks & Shadows; Bear McCreary	Santa Monica Studio; Sony Interactive Entertainment	
2023	Hogwarts Legacy	Chuck Myers; Scott Rakozy; Peter Murray	Avalanche Software; Warner Bros. Games	
2023	Planet of Lana	Takeshi Furukawa	Wishfully Studios; Thunderful Publishing	
2023	Star Wars Jedi: Survivor	Stephen Barton; Gordy Haab	Respawn Entertainment; Electronic Arts	
2024	Indiana Jones and the Great Circle‡	Gordy Haab	MachineGames; Bethesda Softworks	
2024	Final Fantasy VII Rebirth	Masashi Hamauzu; Mitsuto Suzuki	Square Enix	
2024	Nordic Ashes: Survivors of Ragnarok	Rubén Melià	Noxfall Studios	
2024	Quidditch Champions	Cris Velasco	Unbroken Studios; Warner Bros. Games	
2024	Star Wars: Outlaws	Wilbert Roget II; Jon Everist; Kazuma Jinnouchi	Massive Entertainment; Ubisoft	
