= International Film Music Critics Association Award for Best Original Score for an Animated Film =

International fim music award

The International Film Music Critics Association Award for Best Original Score for an Animated Film is an annual award given by the International Film Music Critics Association, or the IFMCA. The award is given to the composer of a film score for an animated film deemed to be the best in a given year. The award was first given in 2007. Previously, animated films were grouped in with live-action films in genre categories. Animated films are still eligible for Film Score of the Year.

== Winners and nominations ==
=== 2000s ===
Movie year	Film	Winners and nominees
2006	Happy Feet	John Powell
2006	The Ant Bully	John Debney
2006	Cars	Randy Newman
2006	Charlotte's Web	Danny Elfman
2006	Ice Age: The Meltdown	John Powell
2007	Ratatouille	Michael Giacchino
2007	Bee Movie	Rupert Gregson-Williams
2007	Beowulf	Alan Silvestri
2007	Meet the Robinsons	Danny Elfman
2007	Tales from Earthsea	Tamiya Terashima
2008	WALL-E	Thomas Newman
2008	Bolt	John Powell
2008	Dr. Seuss' Horton Hears a Who!	John Powell
2008	Ponyo	Joe Hisaishi
2008	Waltz with Bashir	Max Richter
2009	Up	Michael Giacchino
2009	A Christmas Carol	Alan Silvestri
2009	Coraline	Bruno Coulais
2009	Fantastic Mr. Fox	Alexandre Desplat
2009	The Princess and the Frog	Randy Newman

=== 2010s ===
Movie year	Film/Television	Winners and nominees
2010	How To Train Your Dragon	John Powell
2010	The Illusionist	Sylvain Chomet
2010	Legend of the Guardians: The Owls of Ga'Hoole	David Hirschfelder
2010	Tangled	Alan Menken
2010	Toy Story 3	Randy Newman
2011	The Adventures of Tintin	John Williams
2011	The Greatest Miracle	Mark McKenzie
2011	Kung Fu Panda 2	Hans Zimmer and John Powell
2011	Puss in Boots	Henry Jackman
2011	Rango	Hans Zimmer
2012	Rise of the Guardians	Alexandre Desplat
2012	Brave	Patrick Doyle
2012	Frankenweenie	Danny Elfman
2012	ParaNorman	John Brion
2012	Secret of the Wings	Joel McNeely
2013	The Wind Rises	Joe Hisaishi
2013	The Croods	Alan Silvestri
2013	Epic	Danny Elfman
2013	Frozen	Christophe Beck
2013	Planes	Mark Mancina
2014	How to Train Your Dragon 2	John Powell
2014	Asterix: The Mansions of the Gods	Philippe Rombi
2014	The Boxtrolls	Dario Marianelli
2014	Son of Batman	Frederik Wiedmann
2014	Tarzan	David Newman
2015	Inside Out	Michael Giacchino
2015	Gamba: Gamba to Nakama-tachi	Benjamin Wallfisch
2015	Capture the Flag	Diego Navarro
2015	The Good Dinosaur	Mychael Danna and Jeff Danna
2015	The Prophet	Gabriel Yared
2016	The Red Turtle	Laurent Perez del Mar
2016	Kubo and the Two Strings	Dario Marianelli
2016	Moana	Mark Mancina
2016	The Secret Life of Pets	Alexandre Desplat
2016	Zootopia	Michael Giacchino
2017	Animal Crackers	Bear McCreary
2017	Captain Underpants: The First Epic Movie	Theodore Shapiro
2017	Coco	Michael Giacchino
2017	The Emoji Movie	Patrick Doyle
2017	Ferdinand	John Powell
2017	Loving Vincent	Clint Mansell
2018	Max & Me	Mark McKenzie
2018	Incredibles 2	Michael Giacchino
2018	Isle of Dogs	Alexandre Desplat
2018	Spider-Man: Into the Spider-Verse	Daniel Pemberton
2018	Watership Down	Federico Jusid
2019	How to Train Your Dragon: The Hidden World	John Powell
2019	Buñuel in the Labyrinth of the Turtles	Arturo Cardelús
2019	Frozen 2	Christophe Beck
2019	I Lost My Body	Dan Levy
2019	Minuscule 2: Mandibles from Far Away	Mathieu Lamboley

=== 2020s ===
Movie year	Film	Winners and nominees
2020	Wolfwalkers	Bruno Coulais
2020	Fearless	Anne-Kathrin Dern
2020	Onward	Mychael Danna and Jeff Danna
2020	Soul	Trent Reznor, Atticus Ross and Jon Batiste
2021	Raya and the Last Dragon	James Newton Howard
2021	Encanto	Germaine Franco
2021	Luca	Dan Romer
2021	Spirit Untamed	Amie Doherty
2021	Wish Dragon	Philip Klein
2022	Guillermo del Toro's Pinocchio	Alexandre Desplat
2022	The Bad Guys	Daniel Pemberton
2022	Lightyear	Michael Giacchino
2022	Paws of Fury: The Legend of Hank	Bear McCreary
2022	Strange World	Henry Jackman
2024	The Wild Robot	Kris Bowers
