= International Film Music Critics Association Award for Best Original Score for Television =

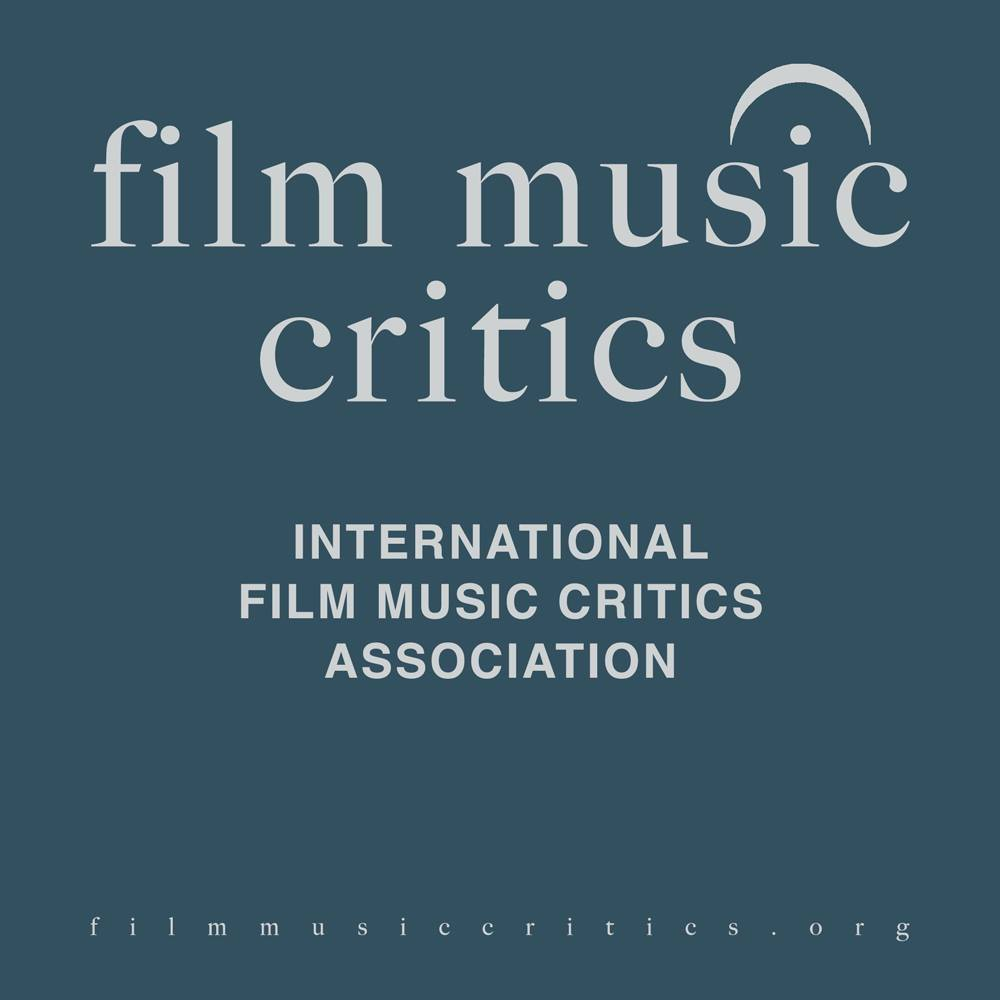
- International Film Music Critics Association logo
- First award: 2004

Highlights
- Most wins: Bear McCreary
- Most nominations: Bear McCreary

The International Film Music Critics Association Award for Best Original Score for Television is an annual award given by the International Film Music Critics Association (IFMCA). Established in 2004, the award is given to the composer of a television score based on two criteria: "the effectiveness, appropriateness and emotional impact of the score in the context of the film for which it was written; and the technical and intellectual merit of the composition when heard as a standalone listening experience." The eligibility period runs from 1 January to 31 December every year, and IFMCA members vote for the winner in the following February.

As of 2025, 74 composers have been nominated for the International Film Music Critics Association Award for Best Original Score for Television. The first award was given to Steve Bartek and Danny Elfman for their work on the television series Desperate Housewives. The most recent recipient, Bear McCreary, won for his score for The Lord of the Rings: The Rings of Power (2024). He is also the award's most successful composer, having won five times from thirteen nominations. Three composers have been nominated more than once in the same year: Ramin Djawadi, Robert Lane, and McCreary.

== Winners and nominations ==
In the tables below, winners are marked by a light green background and a double-dagger symbol (‡).

=== 2000s ===
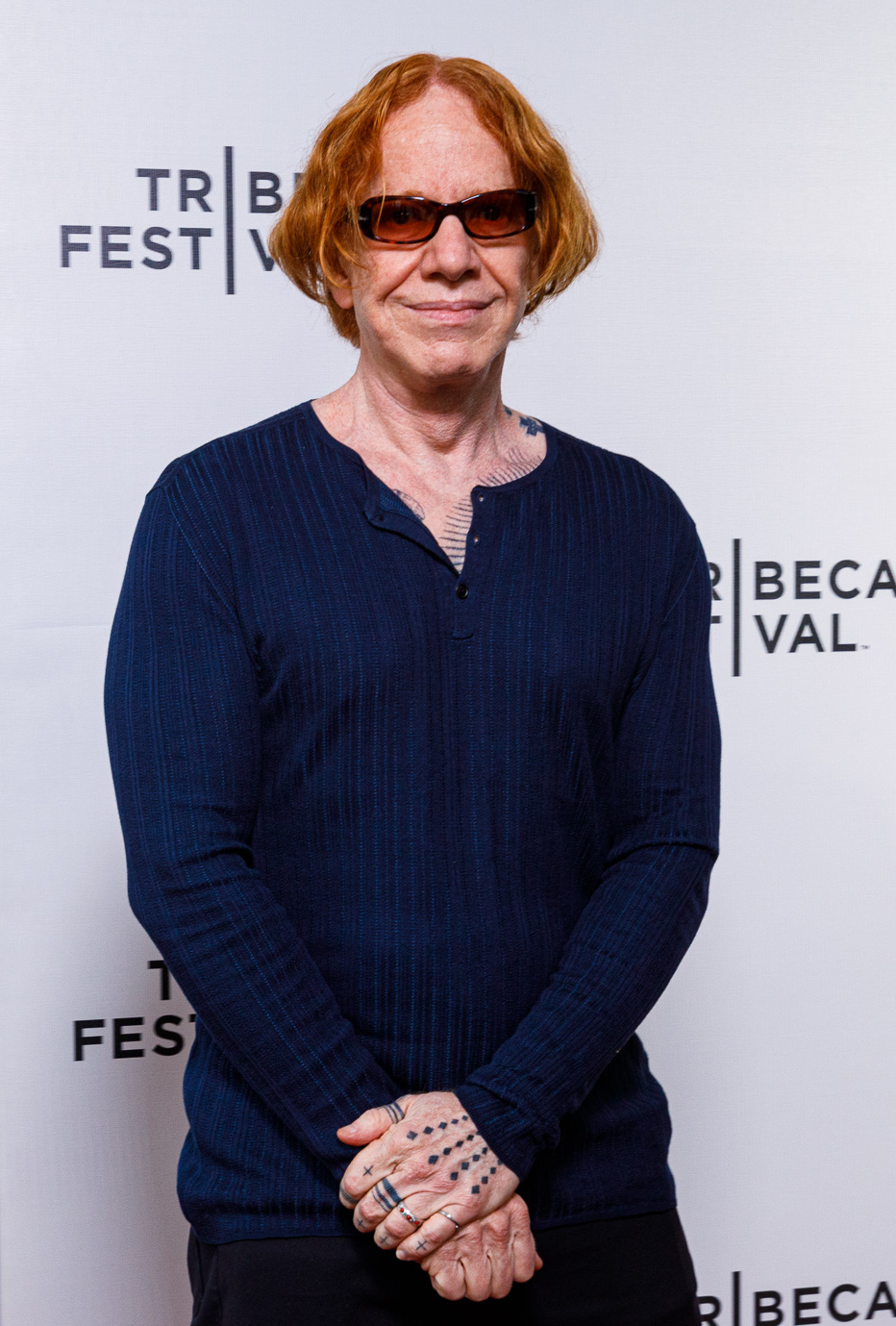
Danny Elfman (pictured in 2022) was a 2004 winner

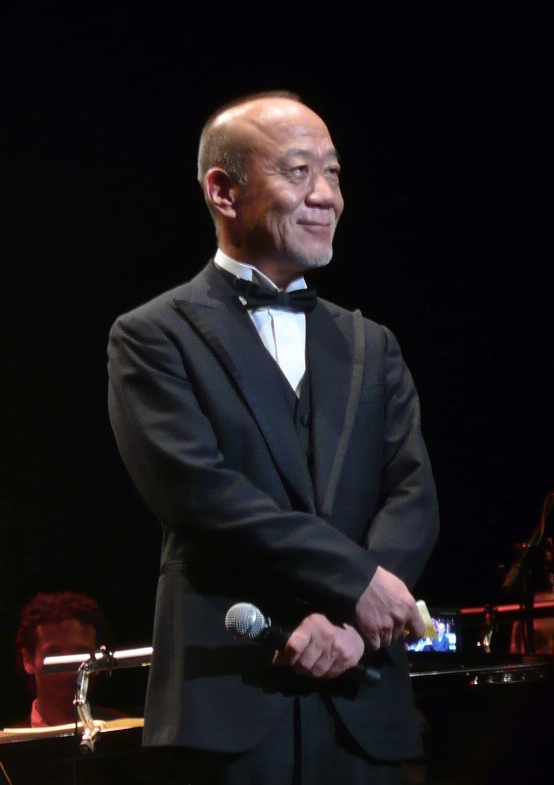
Joe Hisaishi (pictured in 2011) was the 2007 winner

Awards in the 2000s
Year	Television Series	Composer(s)	Broadcaster	Ref.
2004	Desperate Housewives‡	Steve Bartek (series); Danny Elfman (theme)	ABC	
2004	Earthsea	Jeff Rona	Sci Fi	
2004	Helter Skelter	Mark Snow	CBS	
2004	Lost	Michael Giacchino	ABC	
2004	Salem's Lot	Christopher Gordon; Lisa Gerrard	TNT	
2005	Lost‡	Michael Giacchino	ABC	
2005	Battlestar Galactica	Bear McCreary	Sci Fi	
2005	Into the West	Geoff Zanelli	TNT	
2005	Stargate Atlantis	Joel Goldsmith	Sci Fi	
2005	Warm Springs	Bruce Broughton	HBO	
2006	Planet Earth‡	George Fenton	BBC One	
2006	Battlestar Galactica	Bear McCreary	Sci Fi	
2006	Lost	Michael Giacchino	ABC	
2006	The Ten Commandments	Randy Edelman	ABC	
2006	24	Sean Callery	Fox	
2007	The Legend‡	Joe Hisaishi	MBC	
2007	Battlestar Galactica	Bear McCreary	Sci Fi	
2007	Doctor Who	Murray Gold	BBC One	
2007	Lost	Michael Giacchino	ABC	
2007	Tin Man	Simon Boswell	Sci Fi	
2008	John Adams‡	Robert Lane; Joseph Vitarelli	HBO	
2008	Battlestar Galactica	Bear McCreary	Sci Fi	
2008	Lost	Michael Giacchino	ABC	
2008	Merlin	Robert Lane	BBC One	
2008	Pane e libertà	Ennio Morricone	Rai 1	
2009	Battlestar Galactica‡	Bear McCreary	Syfy	
2009	Caprica	Bear McCreary	Syfy	
2009	Life	George Fenton	BBC One	
2009	Lost	Michael Giacchino	ABC	
2009	Yellowstone	Edmund Butt	BBC Two	

=== 2010s ===
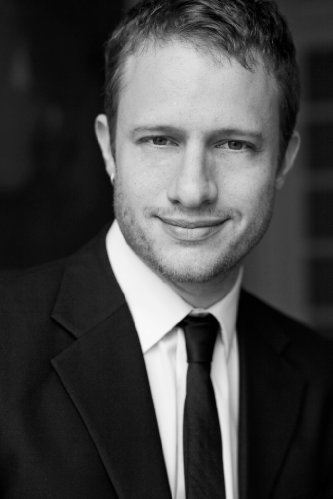
Federico Jusid (pictured in 2014) was the winner in 2013, 2014, and 2015

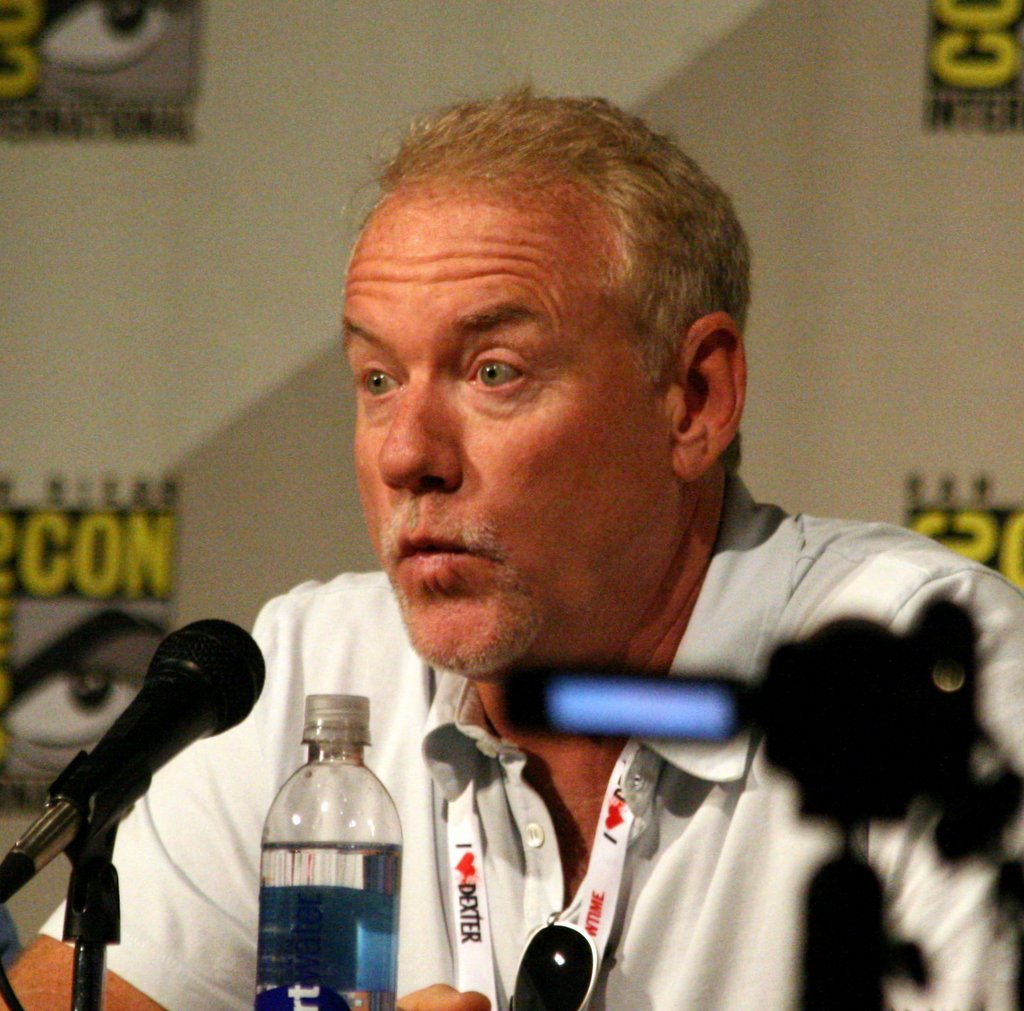
John Debney (pictured in 2013) was a 2017 winner and a 2019 nominee

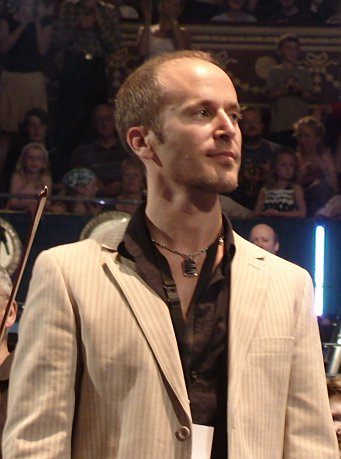
Murray Gold (pictured in 2008) was the 2012 winner

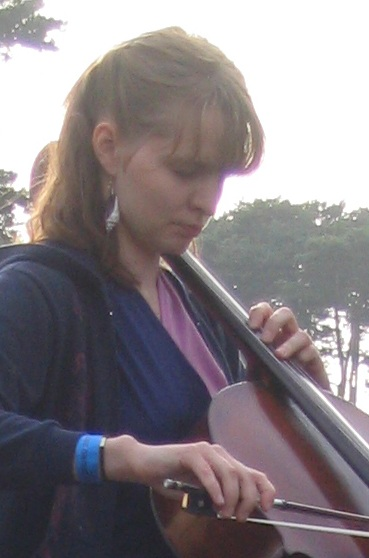
Hildur Guðnadóttir (pictured in 2007) was the 2019 winner

Awards in the 2010s
Year	Television Series	Composer(s)	Broadcaster	Ref.
2010	Human Target‡	Bear McCreary	Fox	
2010	An Eye for an Eye	Marc Vaíllo	TV3	
2010	Doctor Who	Murray Gold	BBC One	
2010	Lost	Michael Giacchino	ABC	
2010	Time of Honor	Bartosz Chajdecki	TVP2	
2011	Ermessenda‡	Arnau Bataller	TV3	
2011	Doctor Who	Murray Gold	BBC One	
2011	Downton Abbey	John Lunn	PBS	
2011	Game of Thrones	Ramin Djawadi	HBO	
2011	Sherlock	David Arnold; Michael Price	PBS	
2012	Doctor Who‡	Murray Gold	BBC One	
2012	Downton Abbey	John Lunn	PBS	
2012	Green Lantern: The Animated Series	Frederik Wiedmann	Cartoon Network	
2012	Isabel	Federico Jusid	La 1	
2012	Priceless	Naoki Satō	Fuji TV	
2013	Isabel‡	Federico Jusid	La 1	
2013	Da Vinci's Demons	Bear McCreary	Starz	
2013	Game of Thrones	Ramin Djawadi	HBO	
2013	The Time in Between	Cesar Benito	Antena 3	
2013	Time of Honor	Bartosz Chajdecki	TVP2	
2014	Isabel‡	Federico Jusid	La 1	
2014	Fargo	Jeff Russo	FX	
2014	Gunshi Kanbei	Yugo Kanno	NHK	
2014	The Leftovers	Max Richter	HBO	
2014	Penny Dreadful	Abel Korzeniowski	Showtime	
2015	Carlos, rey emperador‡	Federico Jusid	La 1	
2015	Fargo	Jeff Russo	FX	
2015	Outlander	Bear McCreary	Starz	
2015	Texas Rising	Bruce Broughton; John Debney	History	
2015	Wolf Hall	Debbie Wiseman	PBS	
2016	Game of Thrones‡	Ramin Djawadi	HBO	
2016	The Night Manager	Victor Reyes	AMC	
2016	Penny Dreadful	Abel Korzeniowski	Showtime	
2016	Stranger Things	Kyle Dixon; Michael Stein as Survive	Netflix	
2016	Westworld	Ramin Djawadi	HBO	
2017	The Orville‡	Bruce Broughton (Theme; "Old Wounds"); John Debney; Joel McNeely; Andrew Cottee	Fox	
2017	Alias Grace	Mychael Danna; Jeff Danna	Netflix	
2017	Game of Thrones	Ramin Djawadi	HBO	
2017	Morocco: Love in Times of War	Federico Jusid	Netflix	
2017	Naotora: The Lady Warlord	Yoko Kanno	NHK	
2018	Lost in Space‡	Christopher Lennertz	Netflix	
2018	Cathedral of the Sea	Federico Jusid	Antena 3	
2018	Frontier Love	Mark Chait	Zhejiang TV	
2018	Westworld	Ramin Djawadi	HBO	
2018	Yellowstone	Brian Tyler	Paramount Network	
2019	Chernobyl‡	Hildur Guðnadóttir	HBO	
2019	The Dark Crystal: Age of Resistance	Daniel Pemberton; Samuel Sim	Netflix	
2019	His Dark Materials	Lorne Balfe	HBO	
2019	Good Omens	David Arnold	Amazon	
2019	The Orville	John Debney; Joel McNeely; Andrew Cottee	Fox	

=== 2020s ===
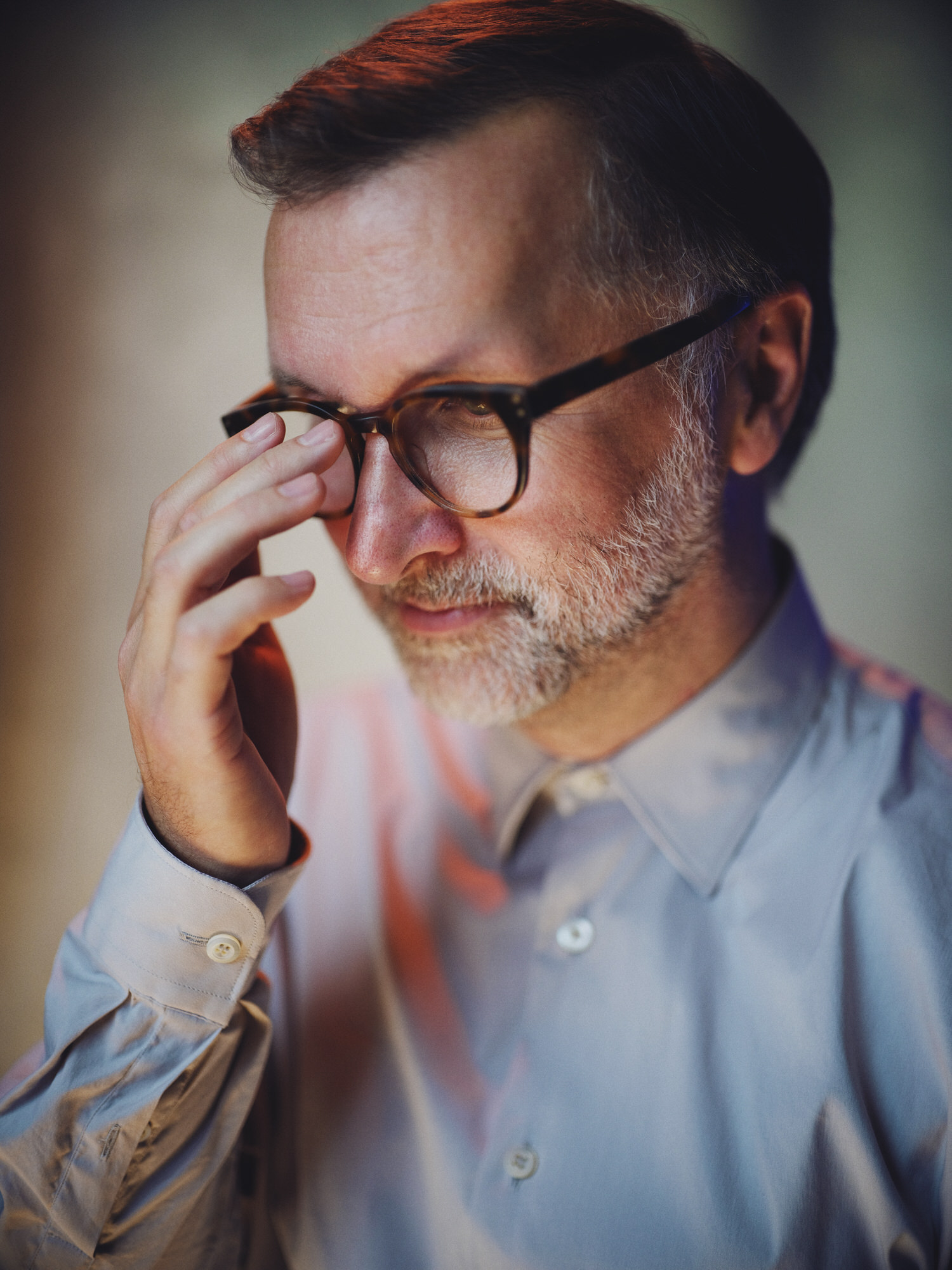
Michael Price (pictured in 2021) was a nominee in 2020

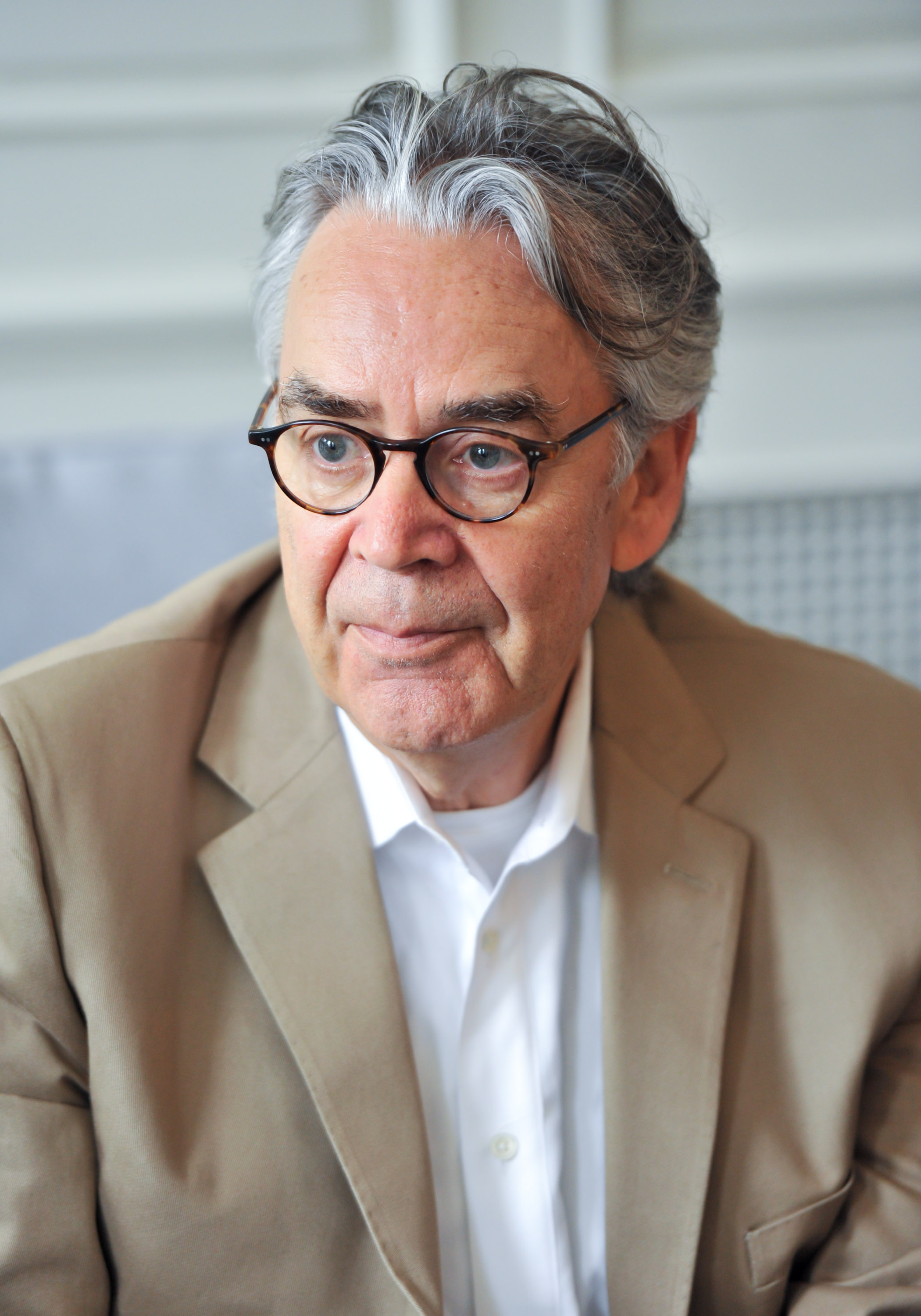
Howard Shore (pictured in 2013) was a 2022 winner

Awards in the 2020s
Year	Television Series	Composer(s)	Broadcaster	Ref.
2020	The Queen's Gambit‡	Carlos Rafael Rivera	Netflix	
2020	Dracula	David Arnold; Michael Price	Netflix	
2020	His Dark Materials	Lorne Balfe	HBO	
2020	Lovecraft Country	Laura Karpman; Raphael Saadiq	HBO	
2020	The Mandalorian	Ludwig Göransson	Disney+	
2021	Masters of the Universe: Revelation‡	Bear McCreary	Netflix	
2021	Cobra Kai	Leo Birenberg; Zach Robinson	Netflix	
2021	Foundation	Bear McCreary	Apple TV+	
2021	Loki	Natalie Holt	Disney+	
2021	Lost in Space	Christopher Lennertz	Netflix	
2022	The Lord of the Rings: The Rings of Power‡	Bear McCreary; Howard Shore	Netflix	
2022	The English	Federico Jusid	BBC; Amazon Prime	
2022	Interview with the Vampire	Daniel Hart	AMC	
2022	Moon Knight	Hesham Nazih	Disney+	
2022	The Orville	John Debney; Joel McNeely; Andrew Cottee; Kevin Kaska; Bruce BroughtonTheme	Fox; Hulu	
2023	All the Light We Cannot See‡	James Newton Howard	Netflix	
2023	Ahsoka	Kevin Kiner	Disney+	
2023	The Fall of the House of Usher	The Newton Brothers	Netflix	
2023	One Piece	Sonya Belousova; Giona Ostinelli	Netflix	
2023	Star Trek: Picard	Stephen Barton; Frederik Wiedmann	Paramount+	
2024	The Lord of the Rings: The Rings of Power‡	Bear McCreary	Amazon Prime Video	
2024	Avatar: The Last Airbender	Takeshi Furukawa	Netflix	
2024	Cobra Kai	Leo Birenberg; Zach Robinson	YouTube Premium; Netflix	
2024	The Penguin	Mick Giacchino	HBO	
2024	We Were the Lucky Ones	Rachel Portman; Jon Ehrlich	Hulu	
