= Grammy Award for Best Score Soundtrack for Visual Media =

Award for visual media soundtrack

- Awarded for: Quality instrumental score soundtrack albums
- Country: United States
- Presented by: The Recording Academy
- First award: 1959
- Currently held by: Ludwig Göransson – Sinners (2026)
- Website: grammy.com

The Grammy Award for Best Score Soundtrack for Visual Media (includes Film and Television) is an honor presented to a composer (or composers) for an original score created for a film, TV show or series, or other visual media at the Grammy Awards, a ceremony that was established in 1958 and originally called the Gramophone Awards. Honors in several categories are presented at the ceremony annually by The Recording Academy of the United States to "honor artistic achievement, technical proficiency and overall excellence in the recording industry, without regard to album sales or chart position".

== History ==
It has been awarded since the 2nd Annual Grammy Awards in 1959. The first recipient was American composer and pianist Duke Ellington, for the soundtrack to the 1959 film Anatomy of a Murder. Originally known as the Grammy Award for Best Sound Track Album – Background Score from a Motion Picture or Television, the award is currently (2026) known as the Grammy Award for Best Score Soundtrack for Visual Media (Includes Film and Television). Until 2001, the award was presented to the composer of the music alone. From 2001 to 2007, the music producer(s) and sound engineer/mixer(s) shared the award. In 2007, the award reverted to a composer-only award. John Williams holds the record for most wins and nominations for the award, with eleven wins out of thirty-four nominations. Austin Wintory's nomination for Journey at the 55th Annual Grammy Awards was the only time that a video game was nominated in this category before the new category of Best Score Soundtrack for Video Games and Other Interactive Media was created in 2022.

== Recipients ==
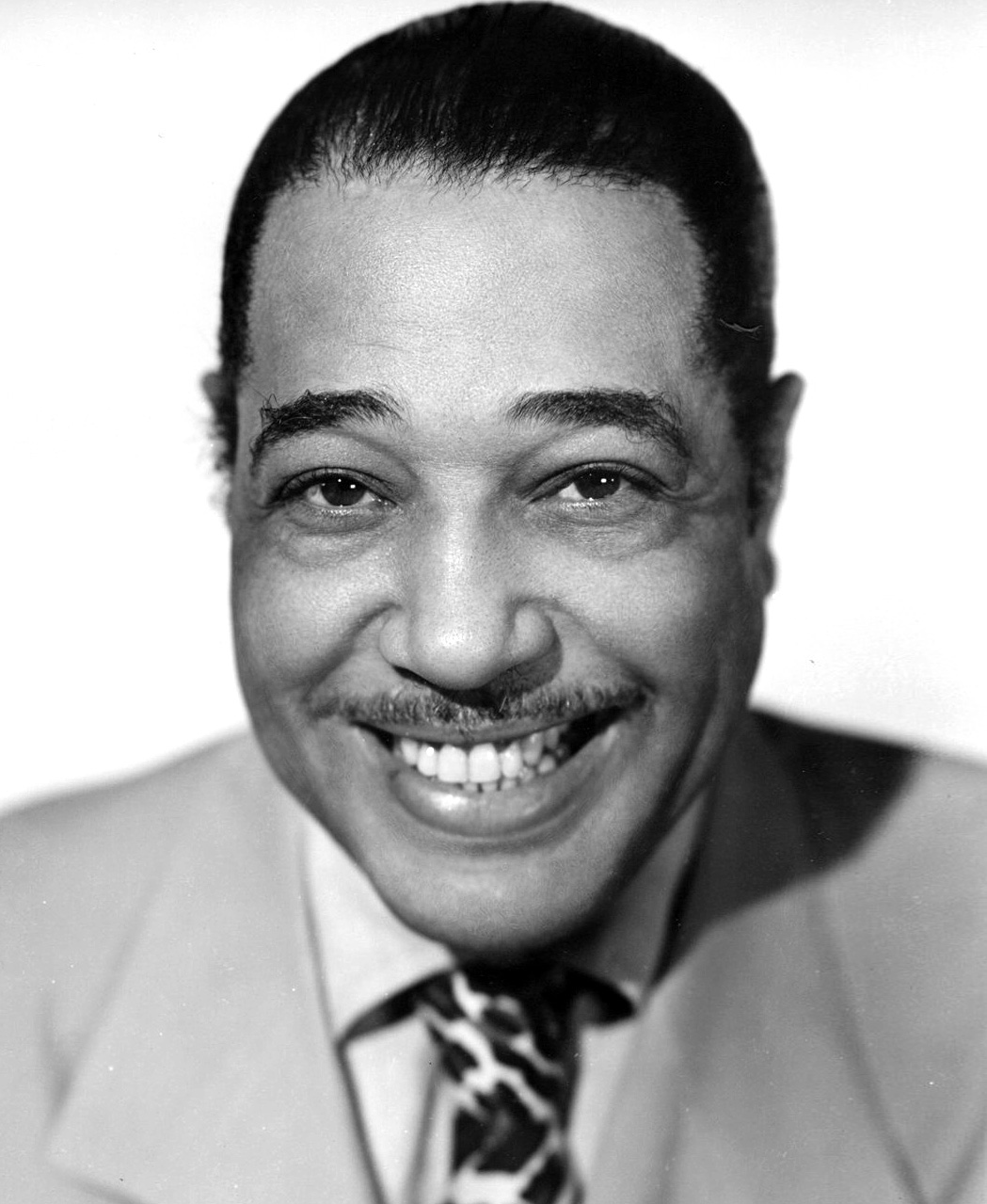
Duke Ellington was the first recipient of the award in 1959 for the Anatomy of a Murder soundtrack.

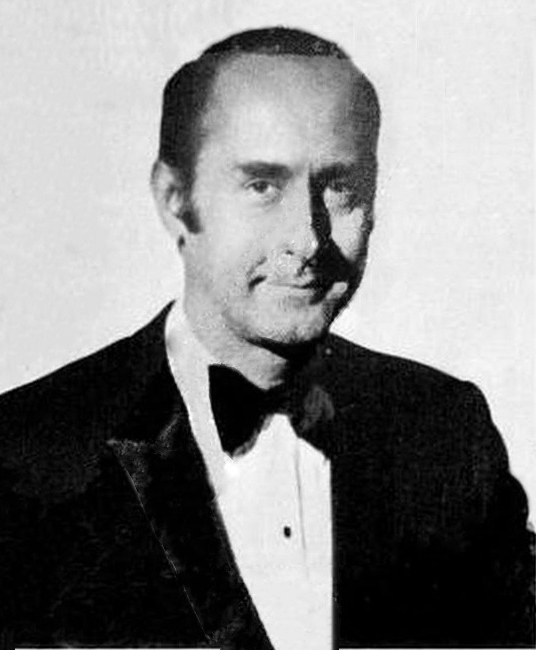
Henry Mancini won in 1962 for the Breakfast at Tiffany's soundtrack.

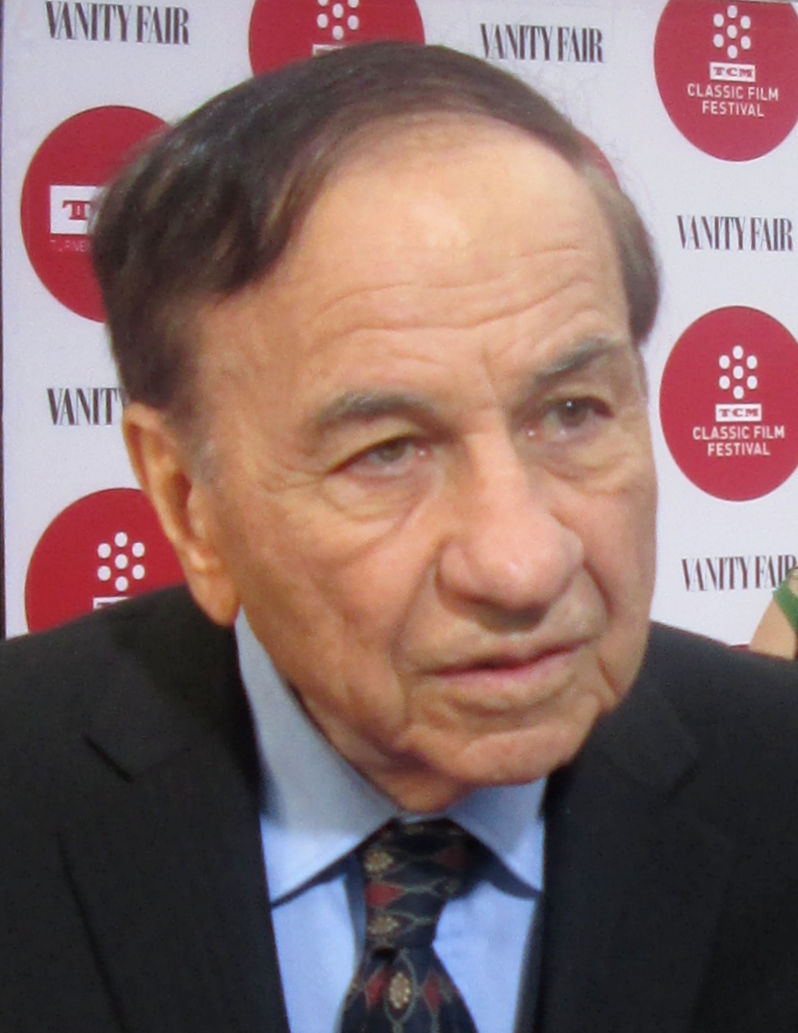
Richard M. Sherman won for Mary Poppins (1965)

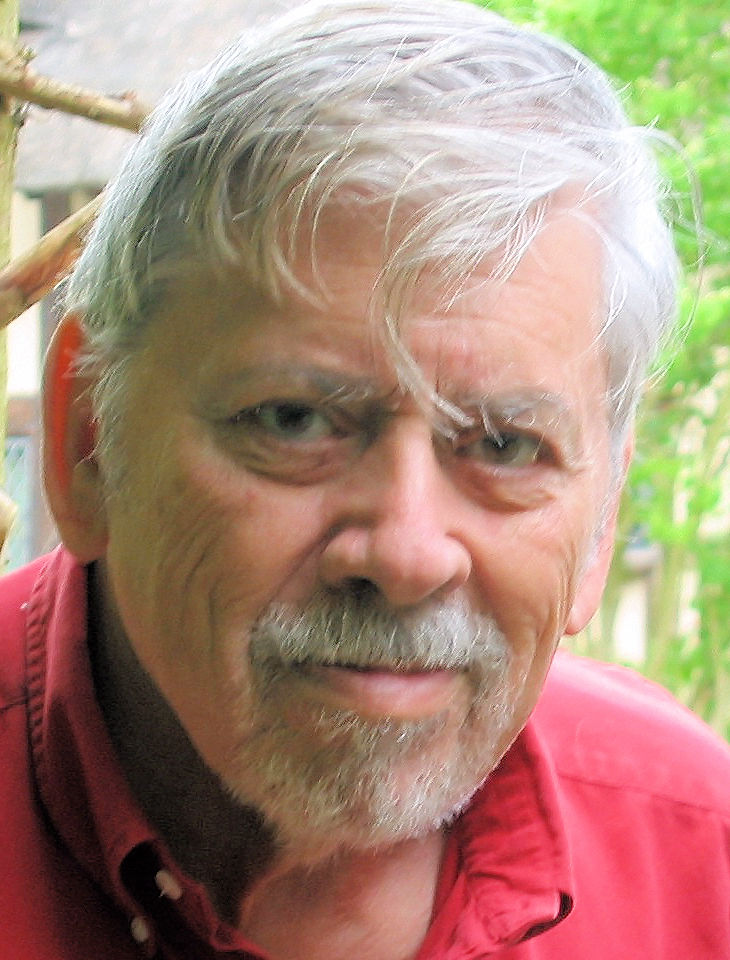
Robert B. Sherman won for Mary Poppins (1965).

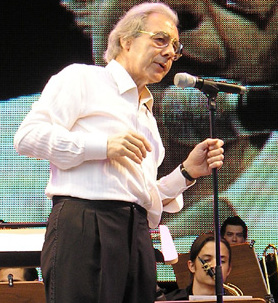
Lalo Schifrin won in 1968 for the TV series Mission: Impossible soundtrack.

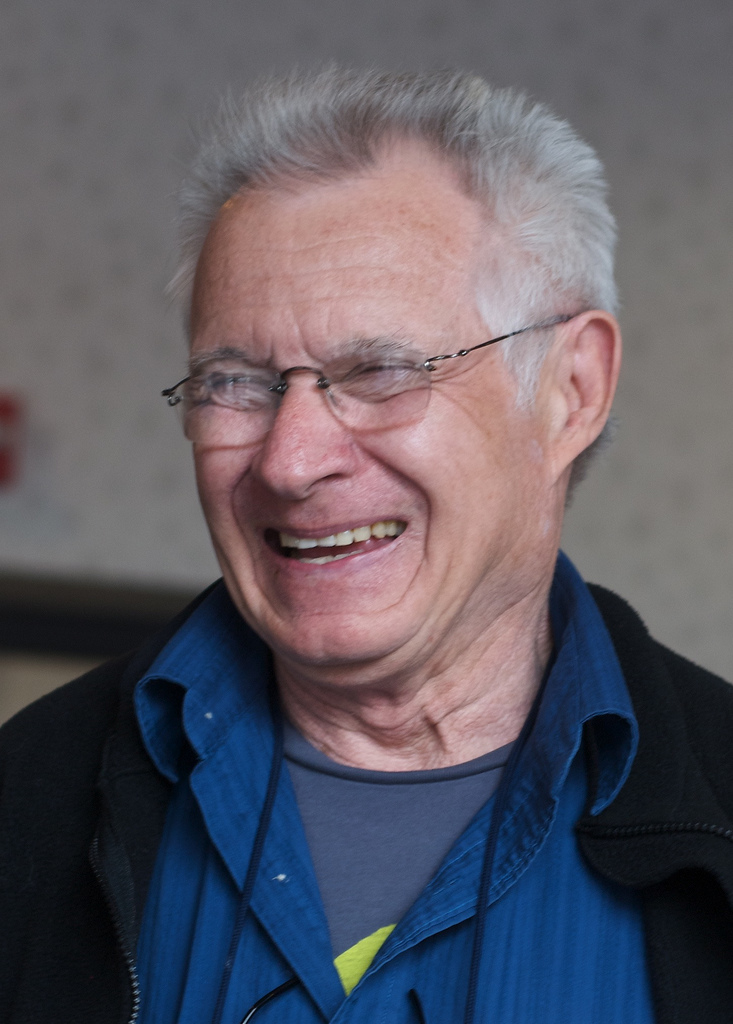
Dave Grusin has won twice, in 1969 for The Graduate soundtrack, alongside Paul Simon, and in 1990 for The Fabulous Baker Boys soundtrack.

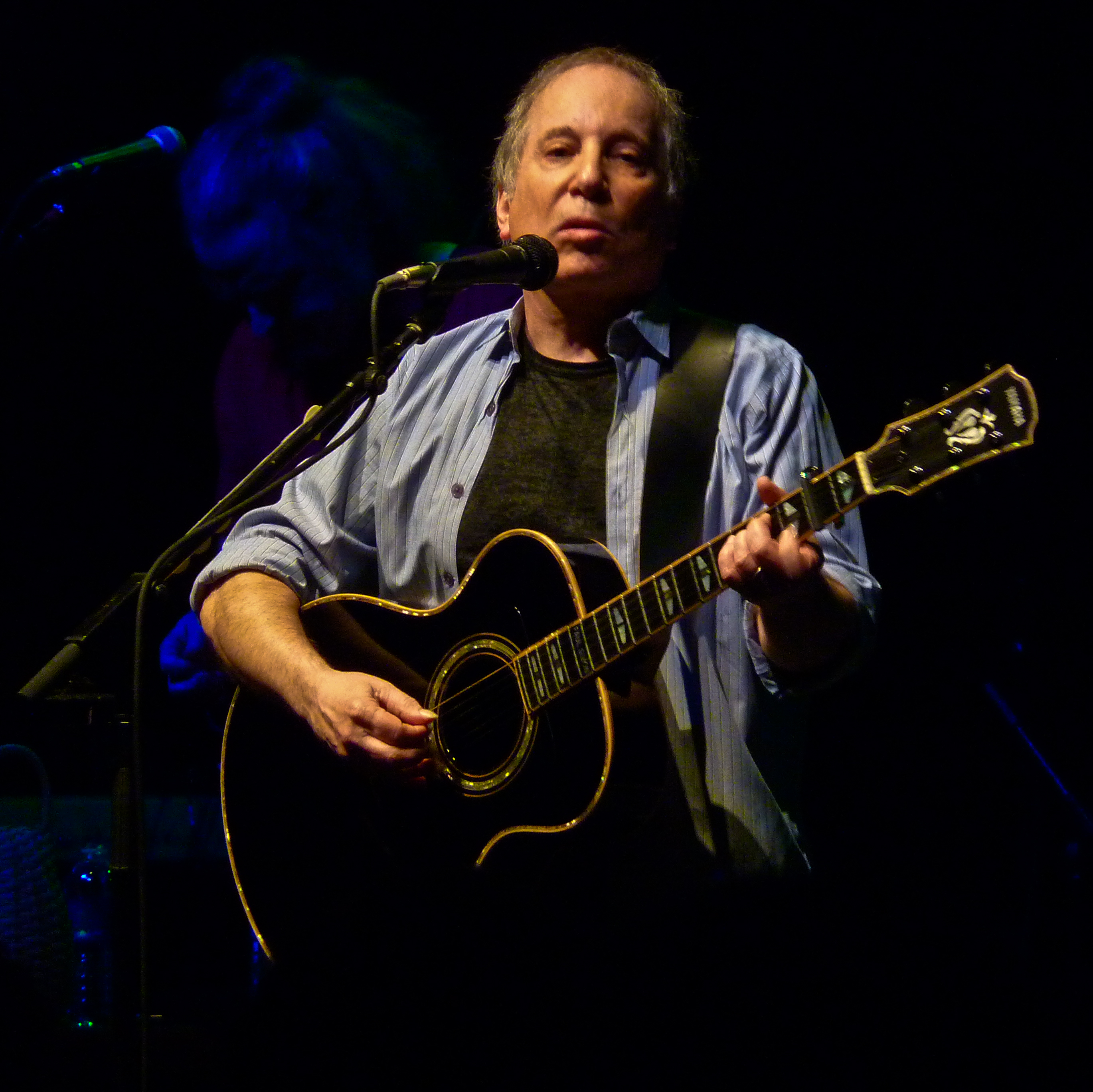
Paul Simon won in 1969 for The Graduate soundtrack, alongside Dave Grusin.

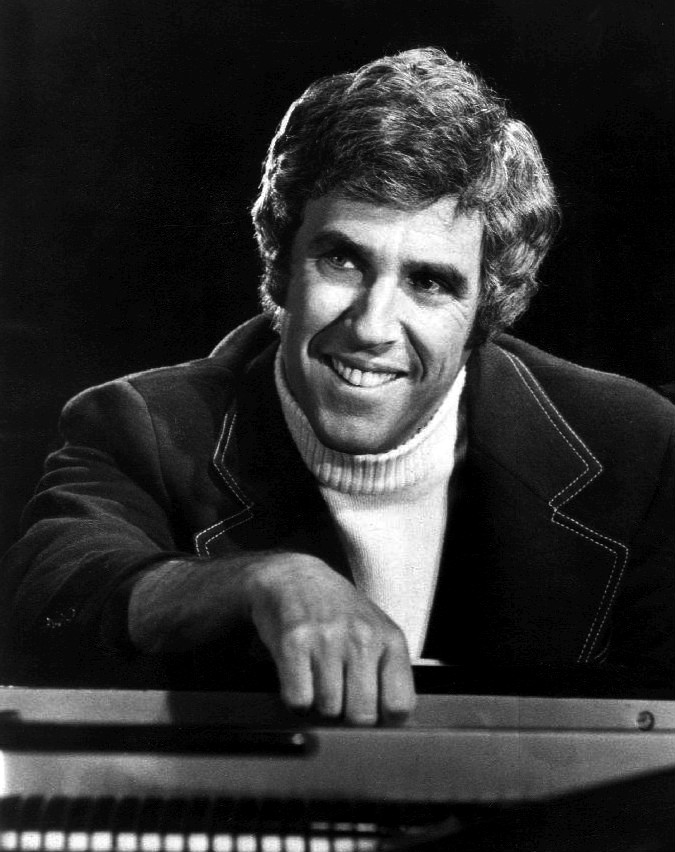
Burt Bacharach won for Butch Cassidy and the Sundance Kid in 1968

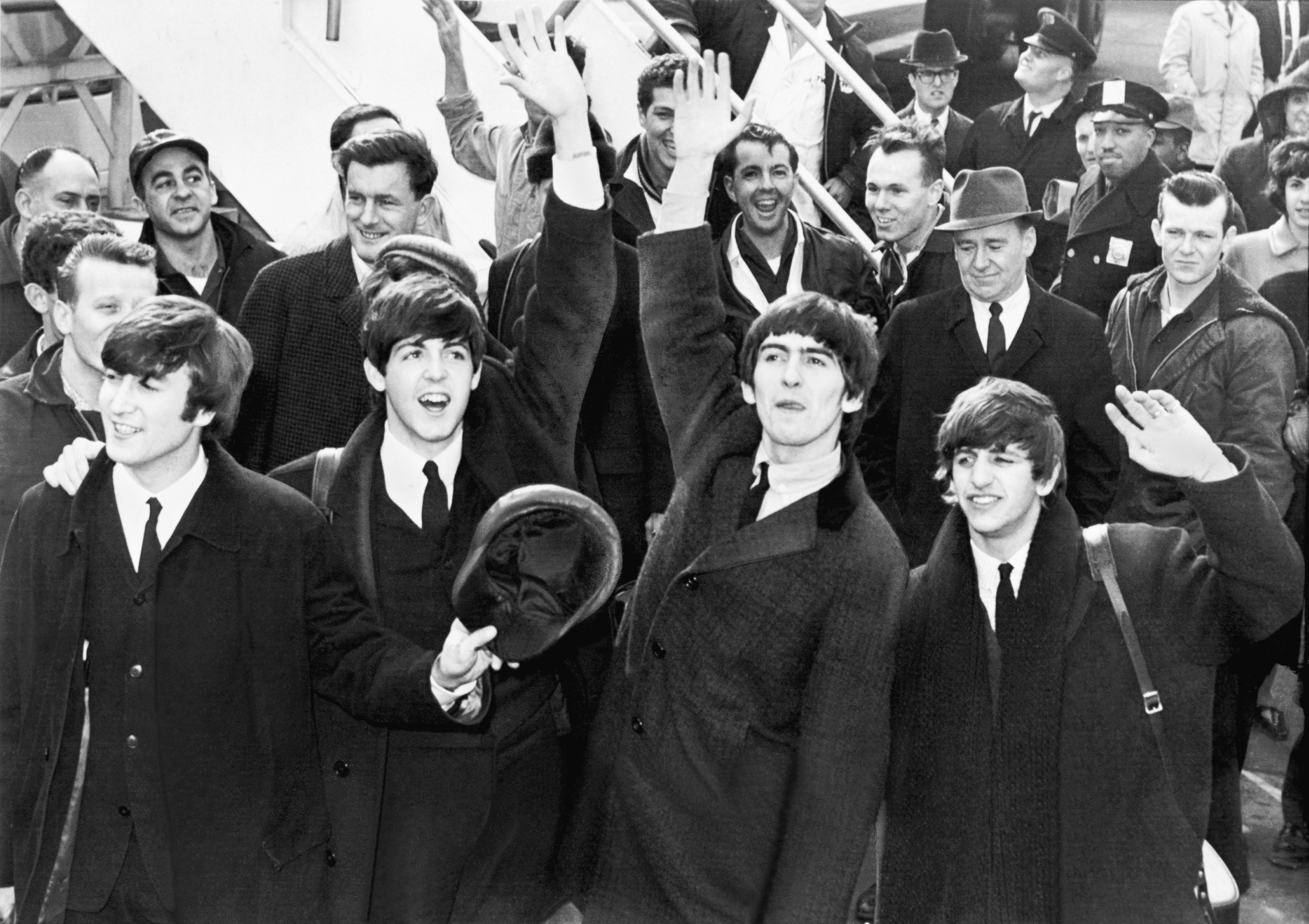
The Beatles won in 1971 for the Let It Be soundtrack.

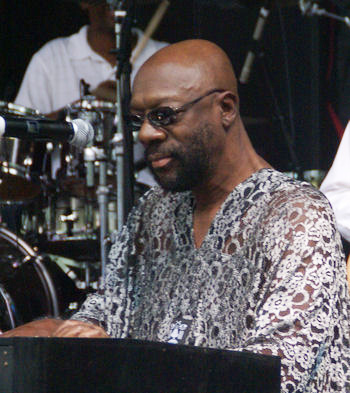
Isaac Hayes won in 1972 for the Shaft soundtrack.

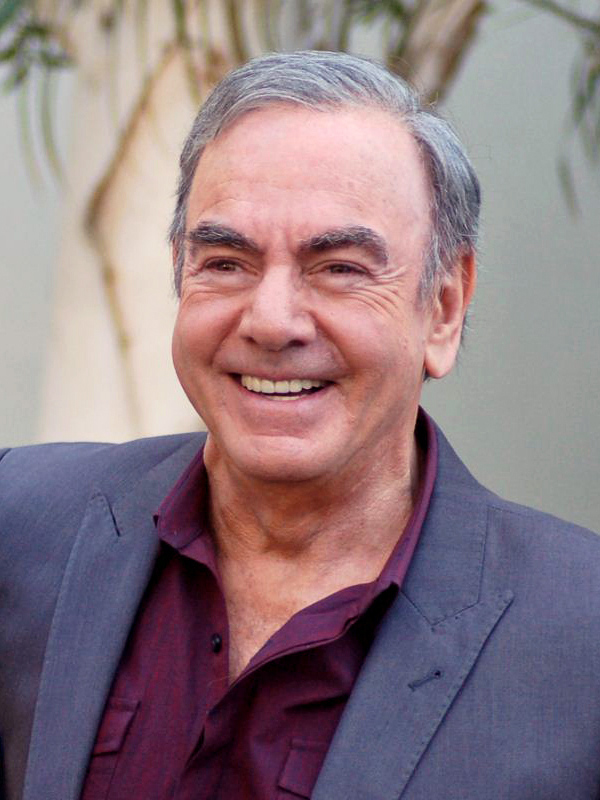
Neil Diamond won in 1974 for the Jonathan Livingston Seagull soundtrack.

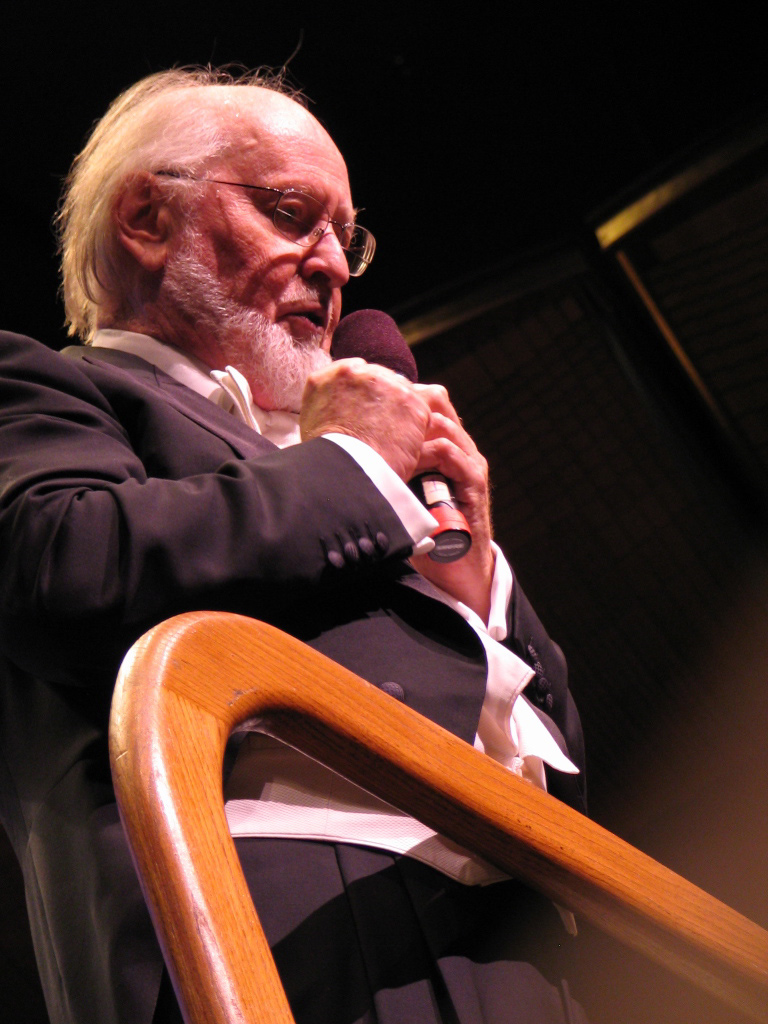
John Williams has won six times in a row, eleven times total, and has been nominated twenty-three more times.

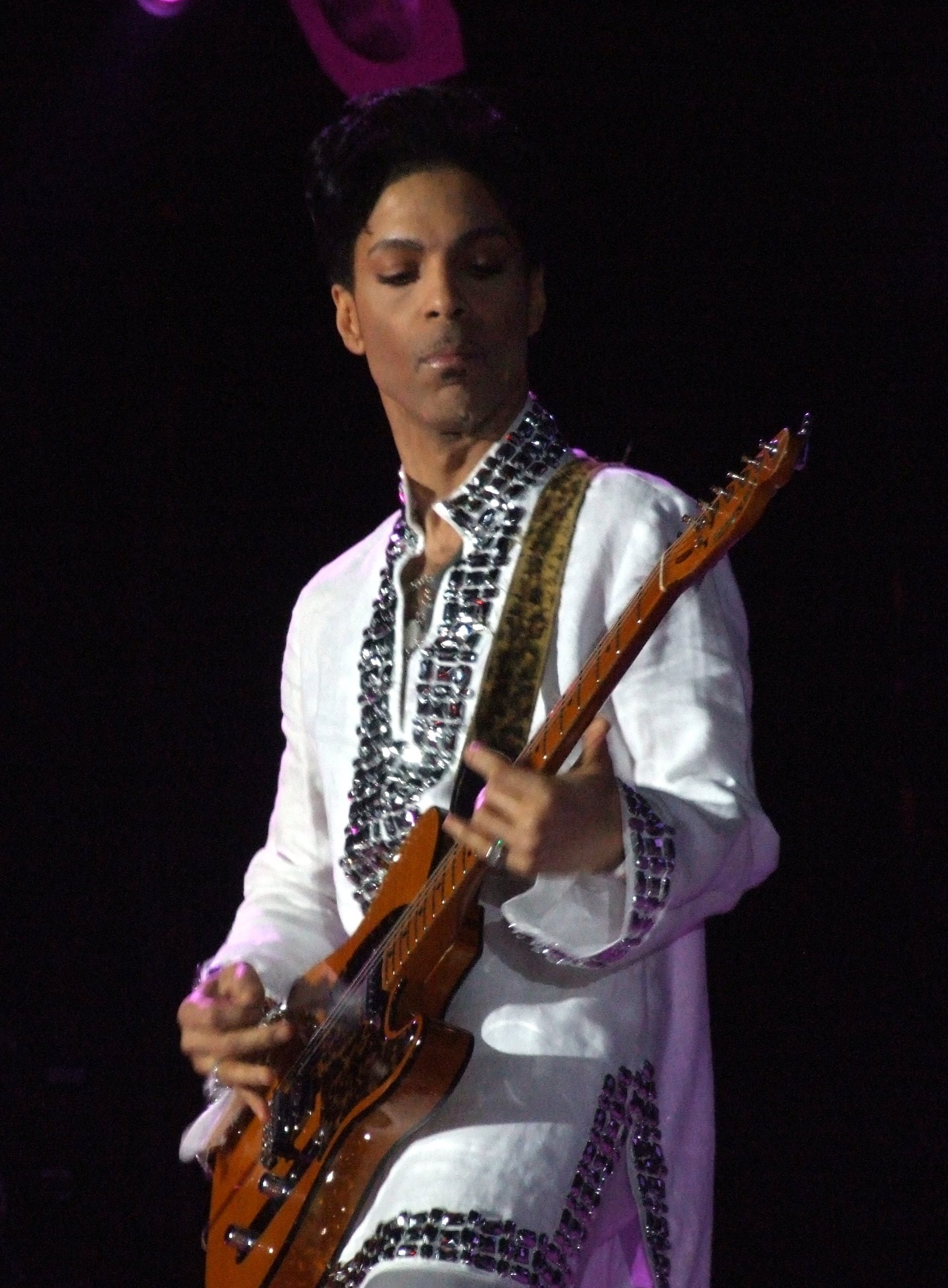
Prince and The Revolution won in 1985 for the Purple Rain soundtrack.

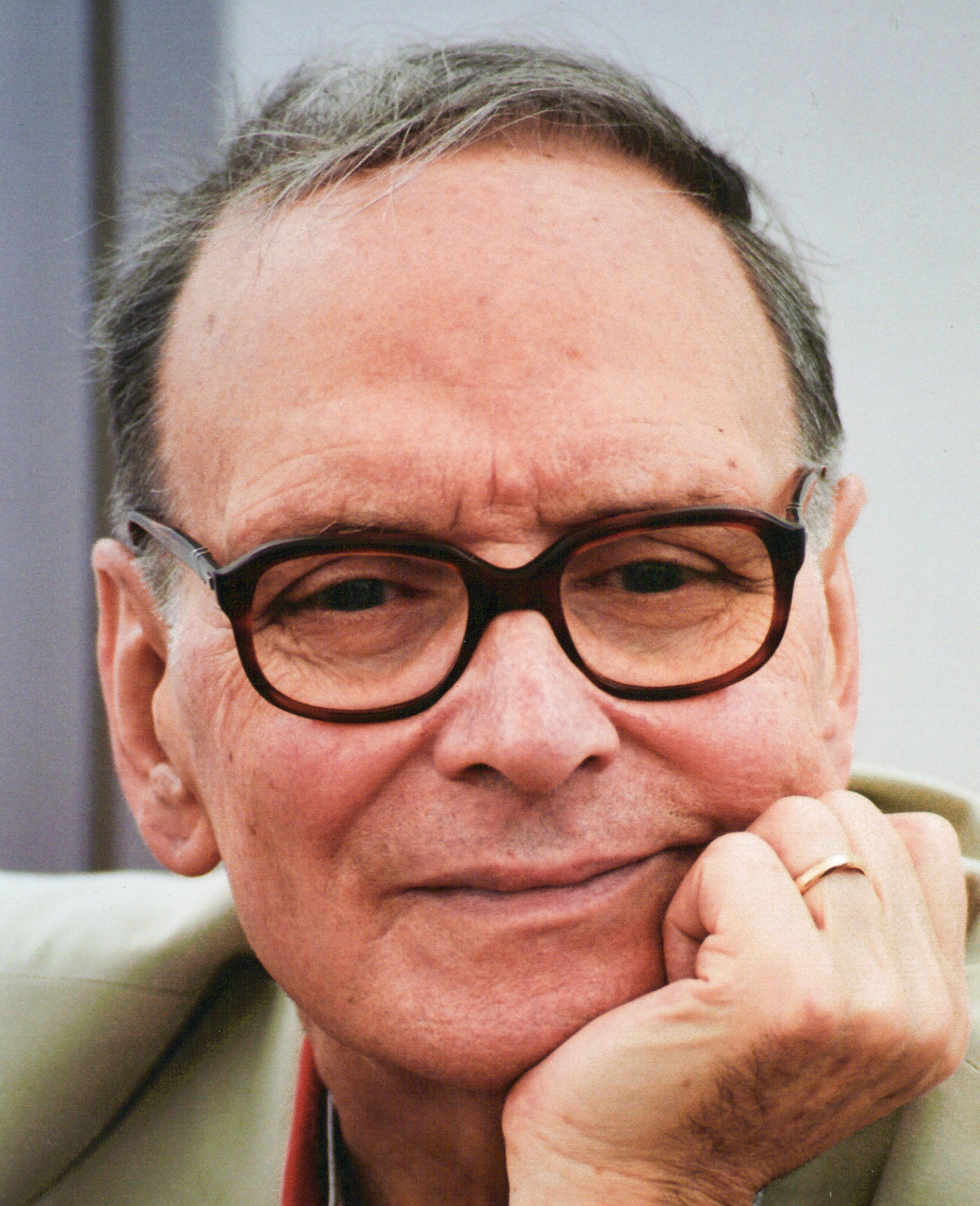
Ennio Morricone won in 1988 for The Untouchables.

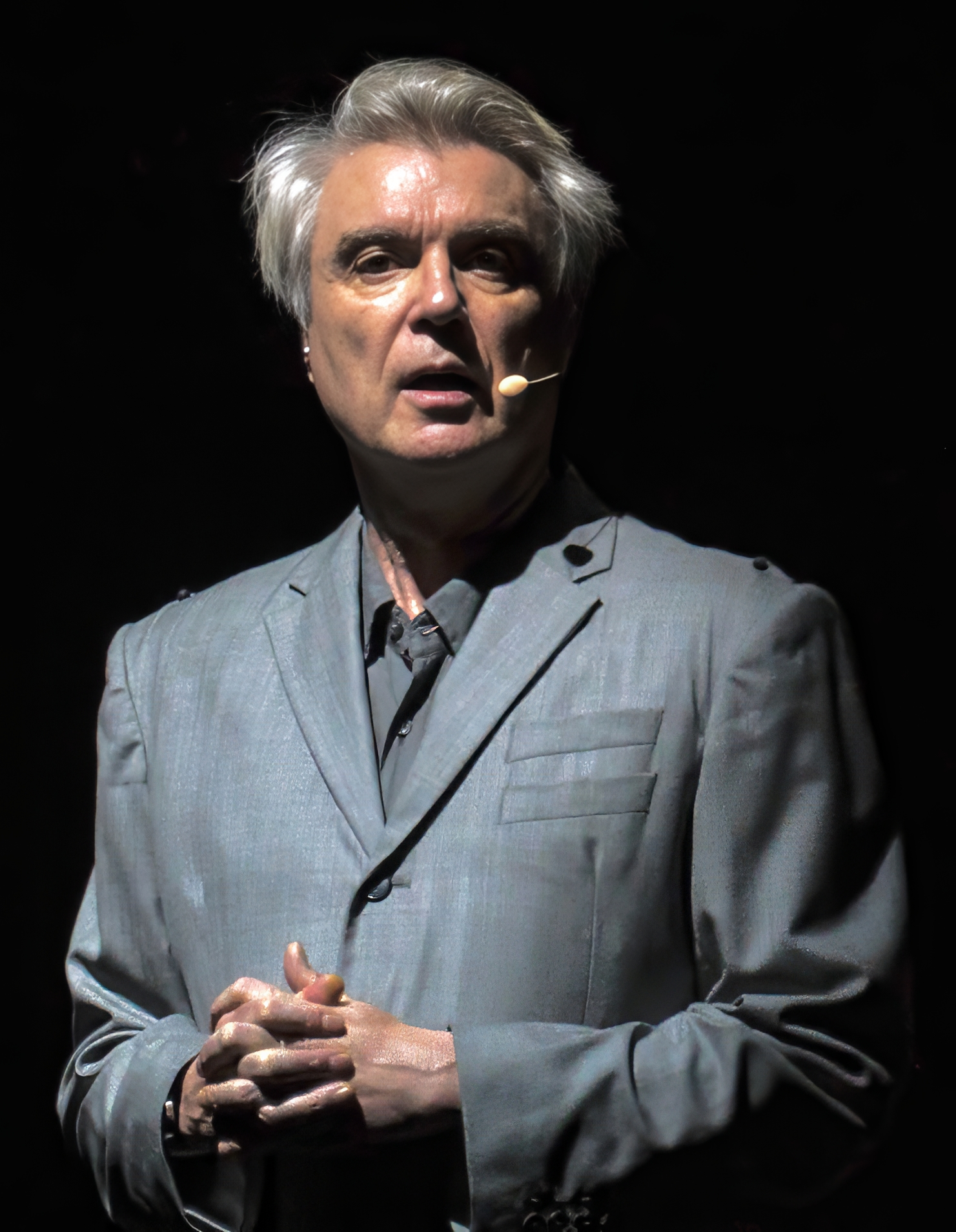
David Byrne won for The Last Emperor (1989)

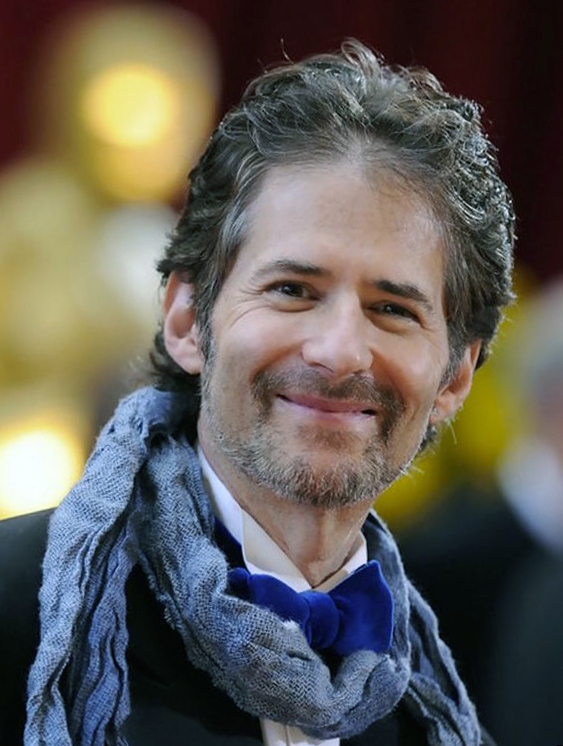
James Horner won in 1991 for Glory.

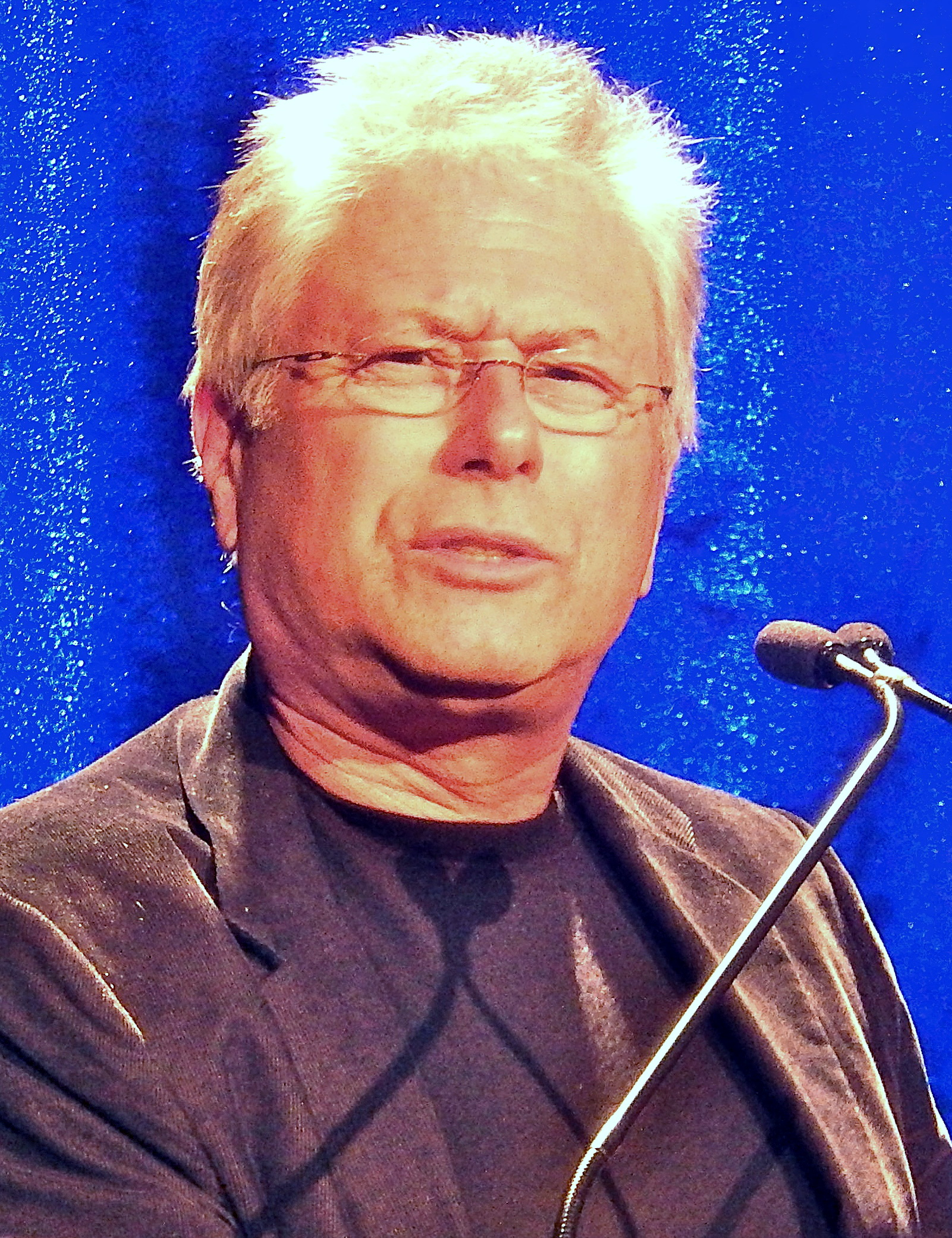
Alan Menken has won twice, for Beauty and the Beast in 1993 and Aladdin in 1994.

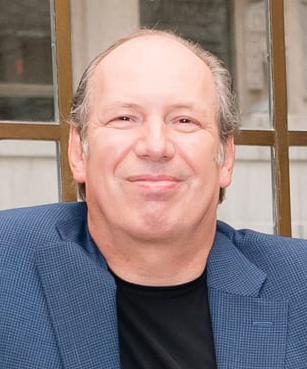
Hans Zimmer has won thrice, for Crimson Tide in 1996, The Dark Knight in 2009 alongside James Newton Howard, and Dune: Part Two in 2025.

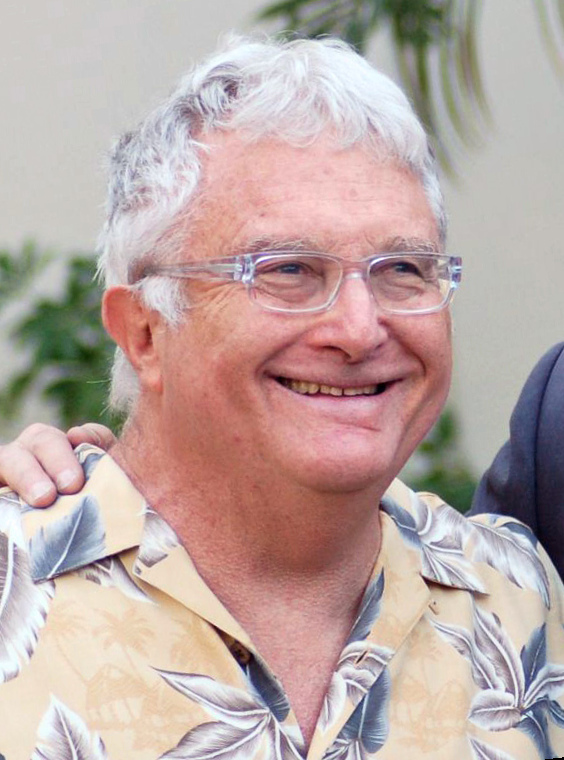
Randy Newman has won twice, for A Bug's Life in 2000 and Toy Story 3 in 2011.

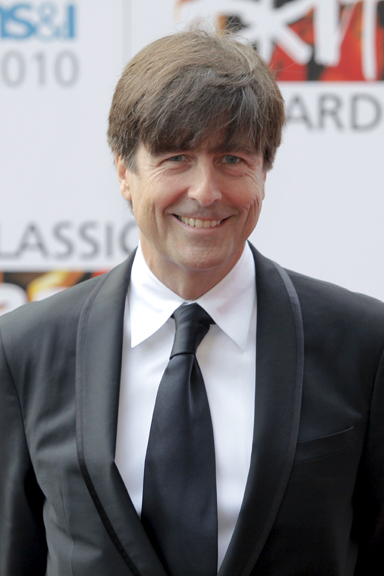
Thomas Newman has won twice, for American Beauty in 2001 and Skyfall in 2014.

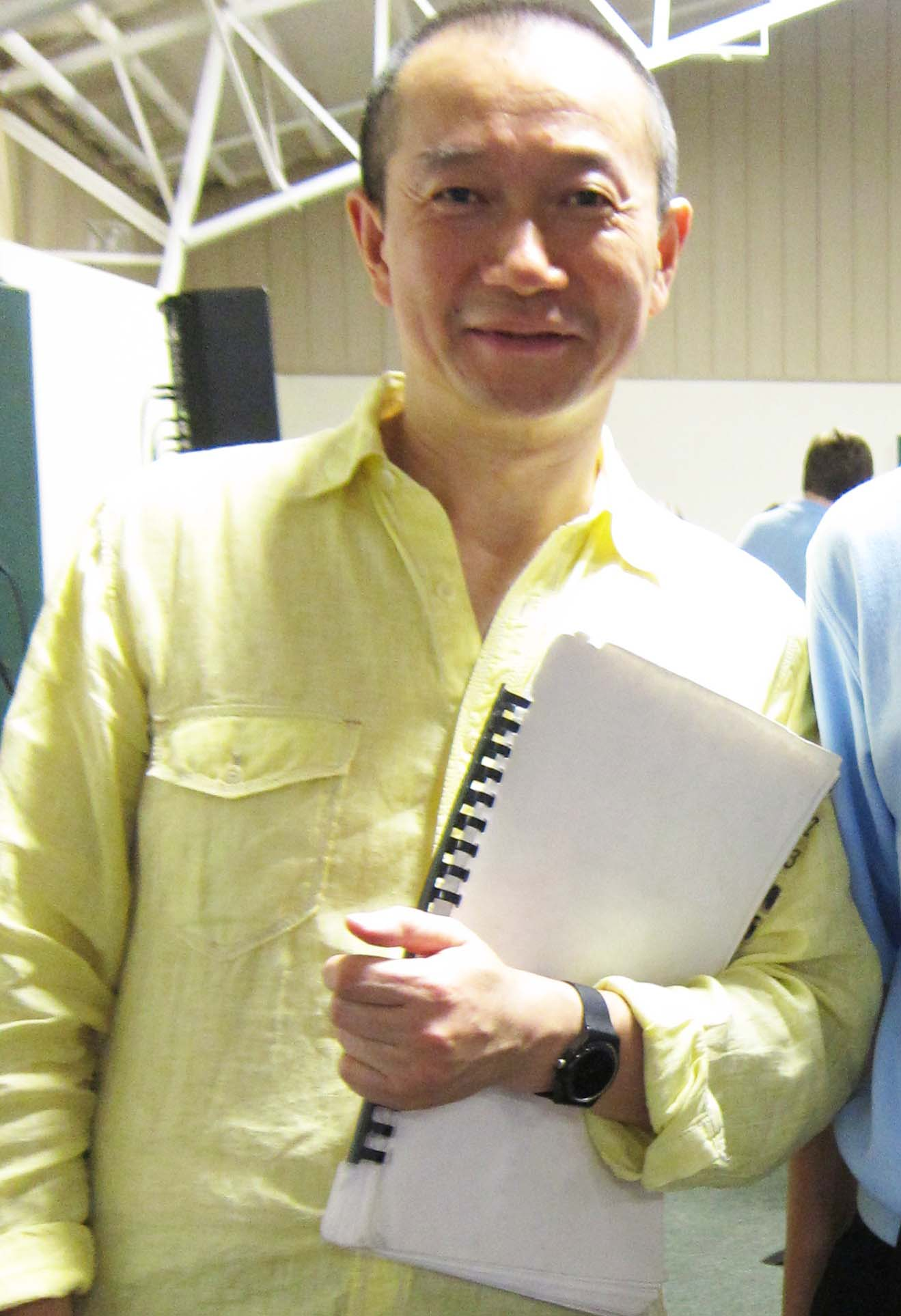
Chinese composer Tan Dun won in 2002 for Crouching Tiger, Hidden Dragon; Dun is currently the only Chinese composer to win the category.

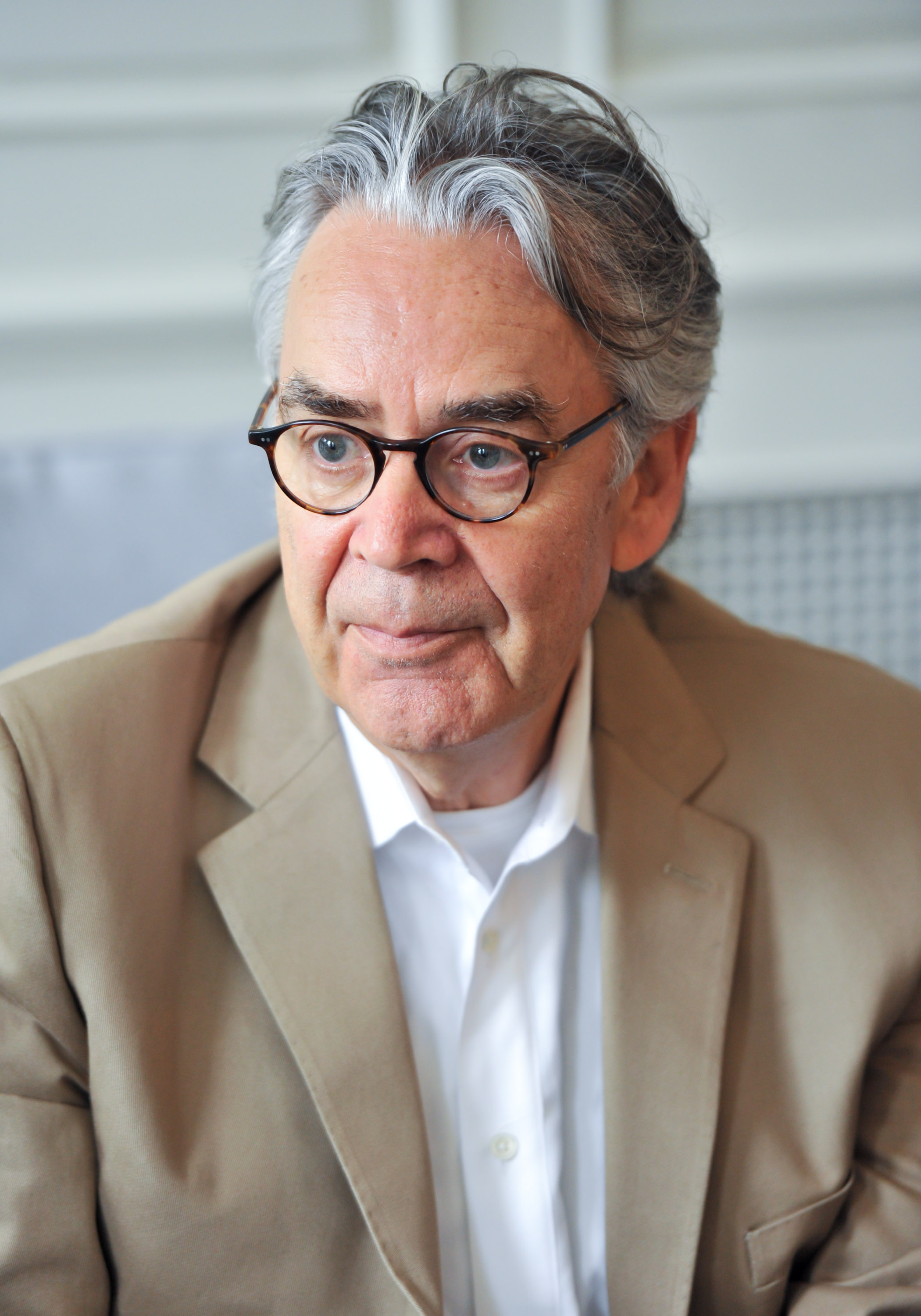
Howard Shore has won the award (alongside John Kurlander and Peter Cobbin) for all three films of The Lord of the Rings film series in 2003, 2004, and 2005.

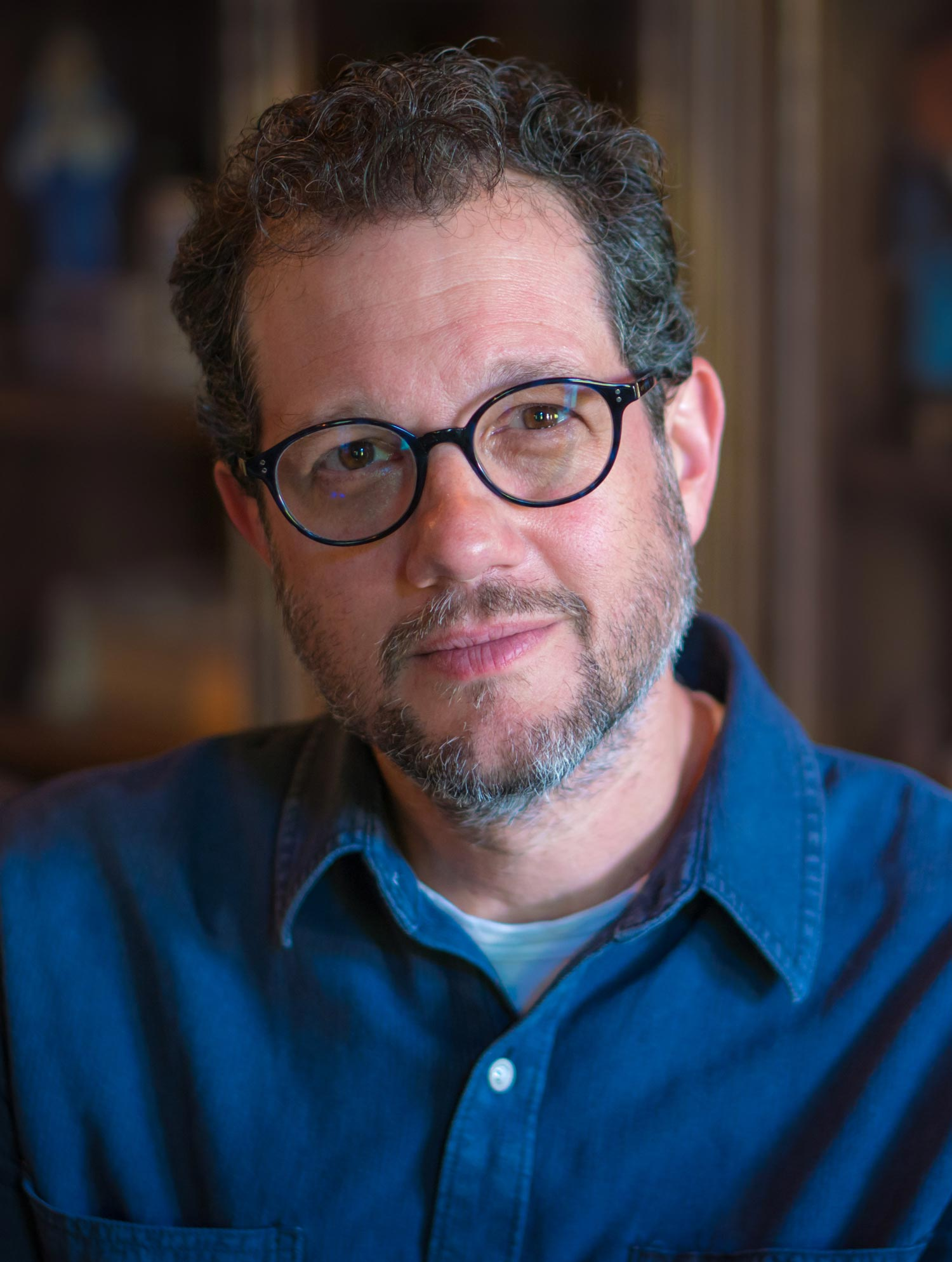
Michael Giacchino won twice for two Pixar films Ratatouille (2008) and Up (2010).

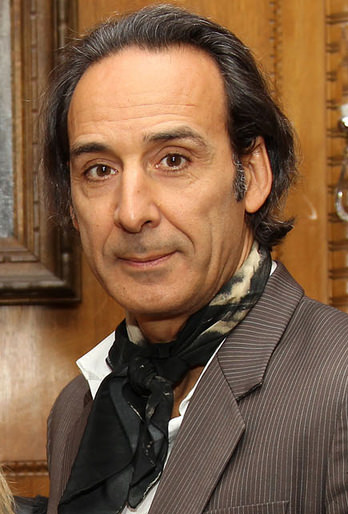
Alexandre Desplat has won twice, for The King's Speech in 2012 and The Grand Budapest Hotel in 2015.

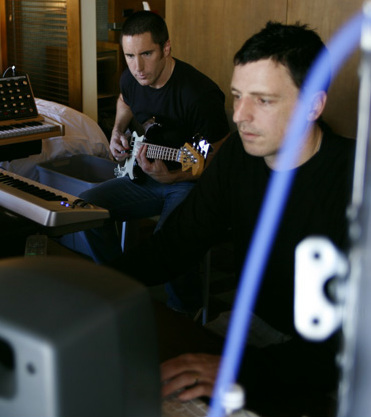
Trent Reznor (left) and Atticus Ross (right), of Nine Inch Nails, have won twice, for The Girl with the Dragon Tattoo in 2013 and Soul in 2022, winning the latter with Jon Batiste.

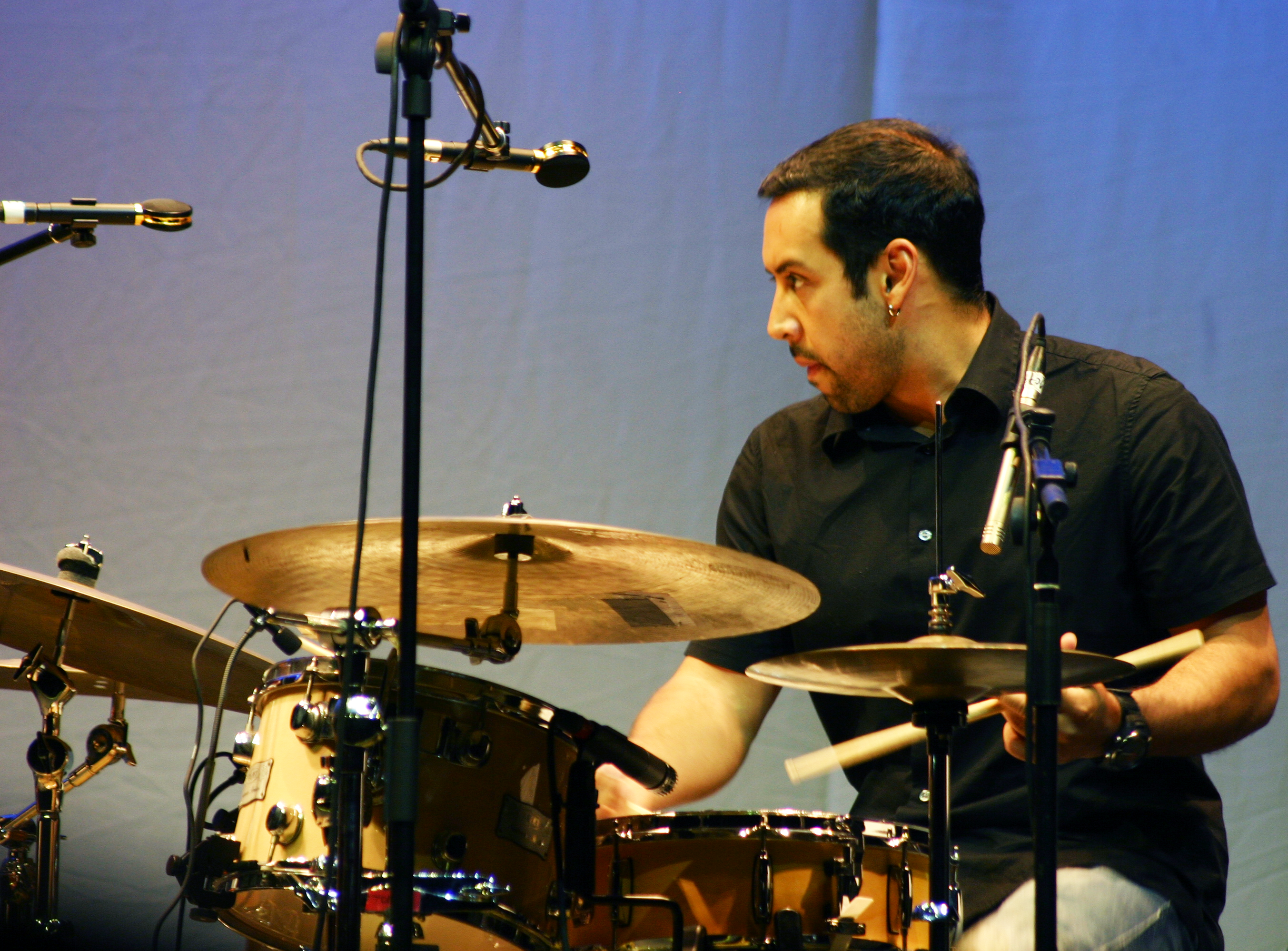
Antonio Sánchez won in 2016 for Birdman.

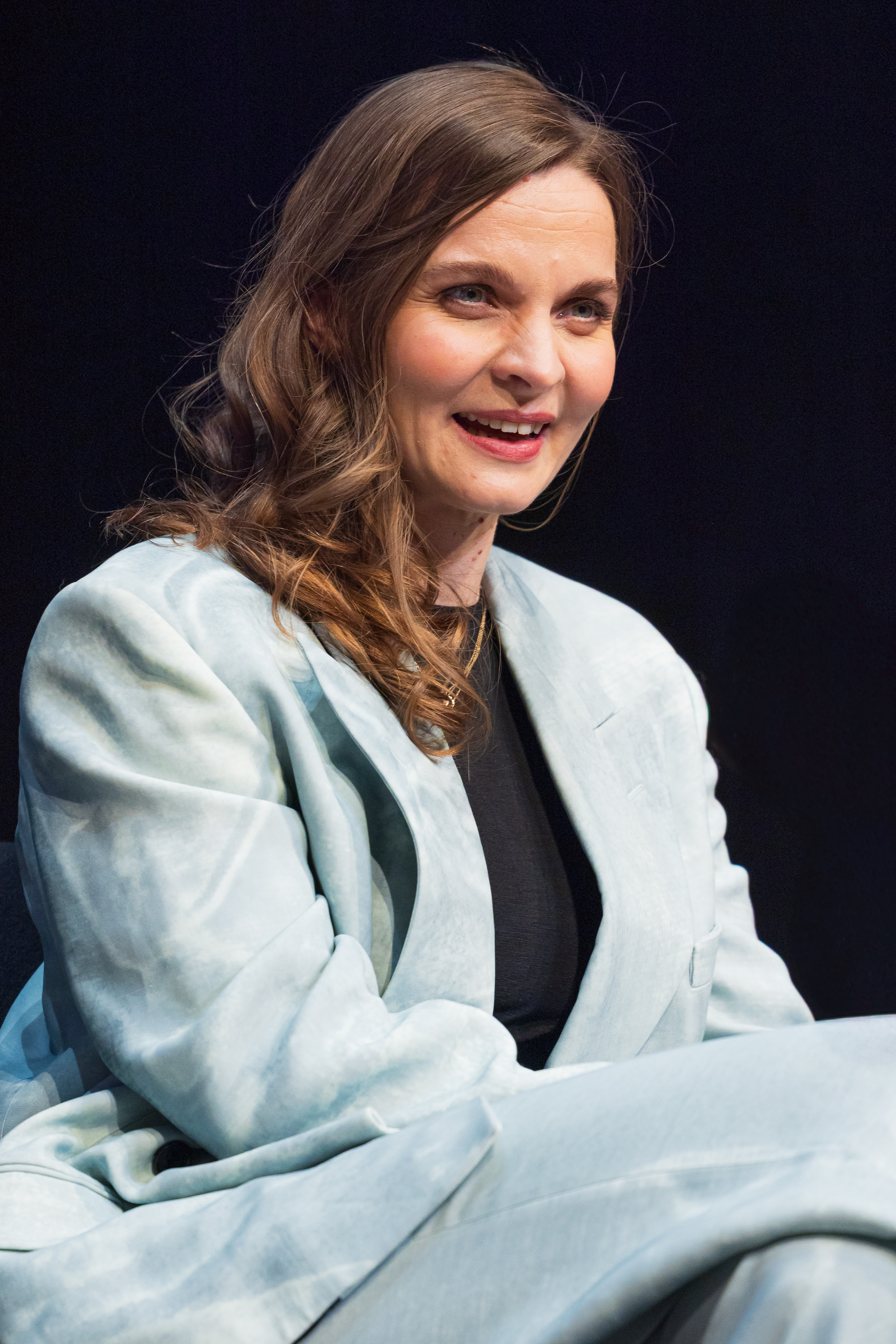
Icelandic composer Hildur Guðnadóttir became the first solo woman to win the award back-to-back (in 2020 for Chernobyl and 2021 for Joker).

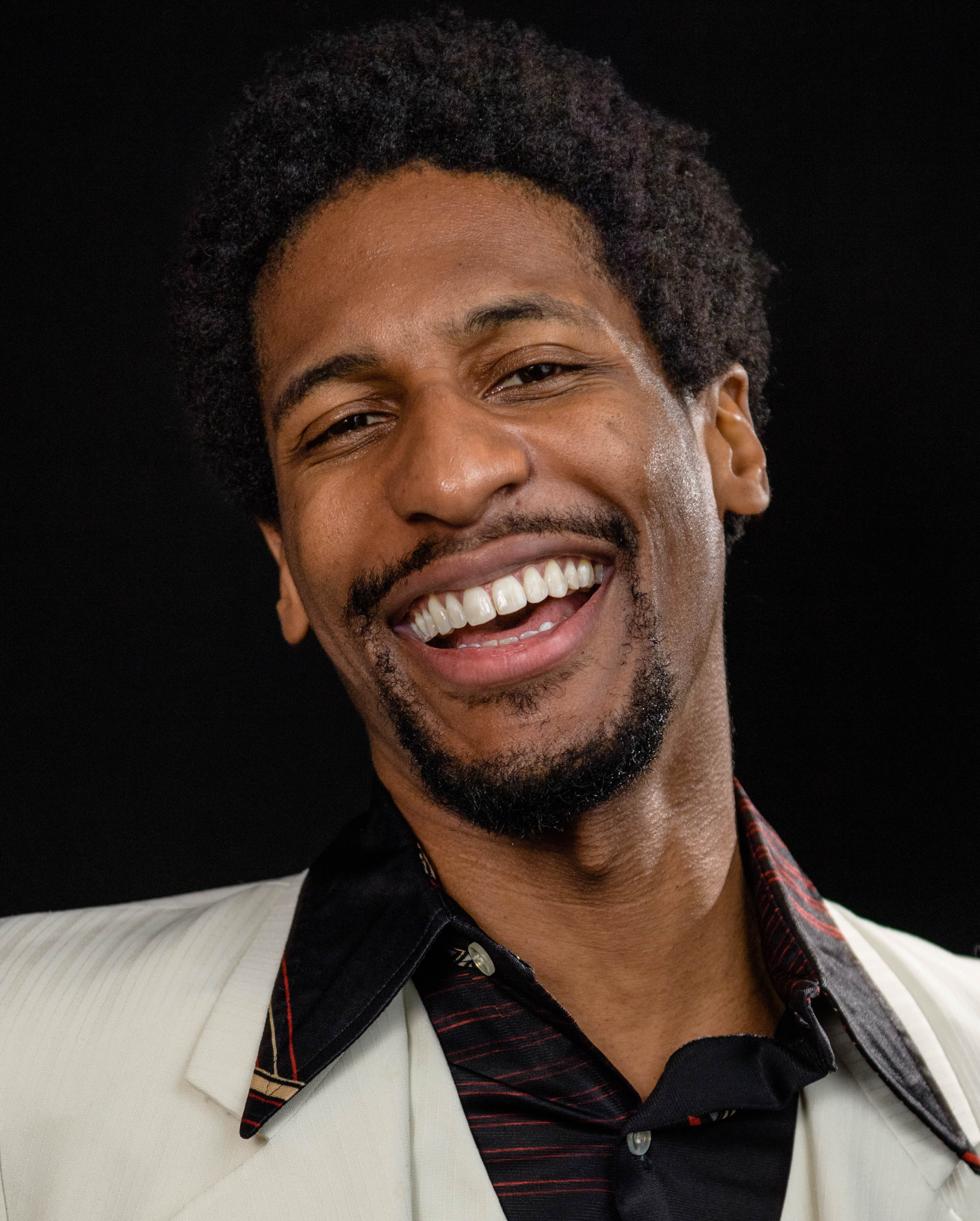
Jon Batiste won for Soul in 2022, alongside Trent Reznor and Atticus Ross.

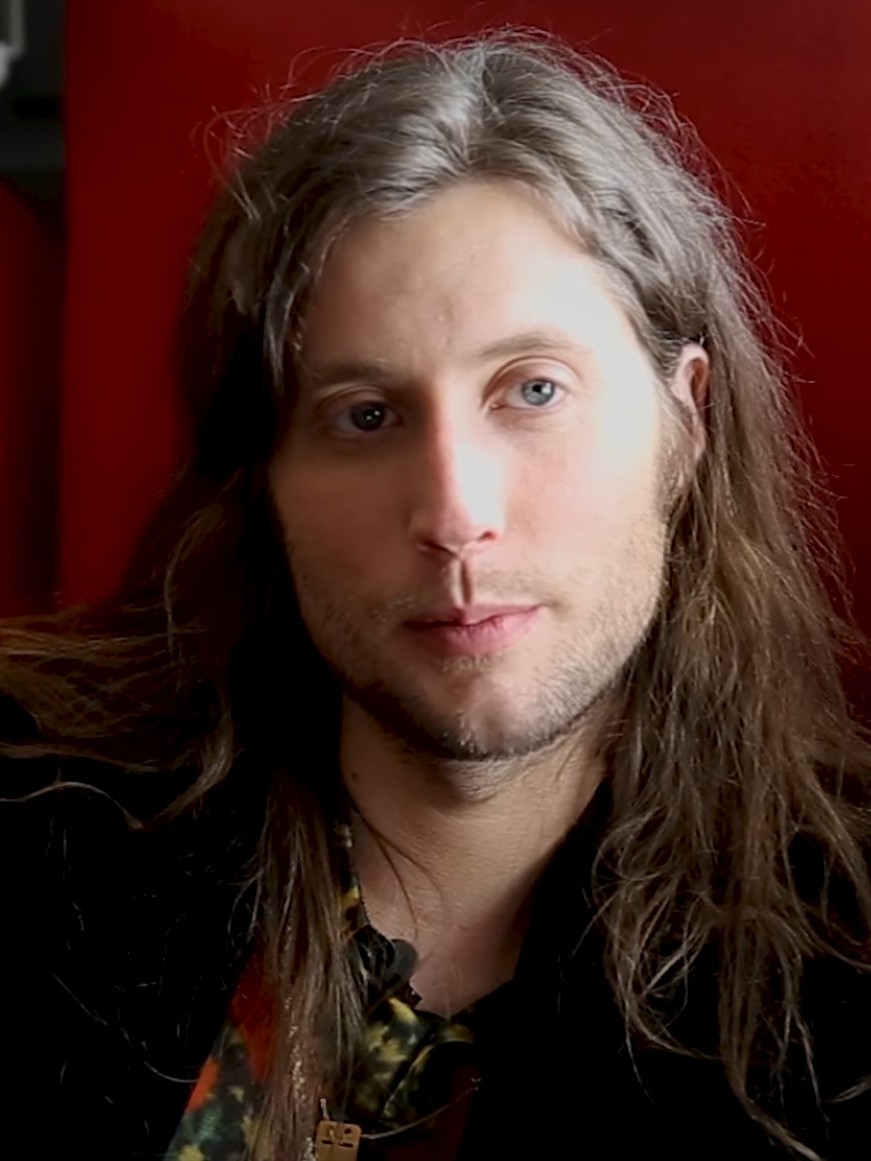
Ludwig Göransson has won thrice, for Black Panther in 2019, Oppenheimer in 2024, and Sinners in 2026.

Years reflect the year in which the Grammy Awards were presented, for works released in the previous year.

=== 1950s ===
Year^{[I]}	Work	Artist
1959
1959	Anatomy of a Murder	Duke Ellington
1959	M Squad	Stanley Wilson
1959	The Nun's Story	Franz Waxman
1959	Pete Kelly's Blues	Dick Cathcart
1959	Peter Gunn	Henry Mancini

=== 1960s ===
Year^{[I]}	Work	Artist
1961
1961	Exodus	Ernest Gold
1961	The Apartment	Adolph Deutsch
1961	Ben-Hur	Miklós Rózsa
1961	Mr. Lucky	Henry Mancini
1961	The Untouchables	Nelson Riddle
1962
1962	Breakfast at Tiffany's	Henry Mancini
1962	Checkmate	John Williams
1962	The Guns of Navarone	Dimitri Tiomkin
1962	La Dolce Vita	Nino Rota
1962	Paris Blues	Duke Ellington
1963
1963	No Award	
1964
1964	Tom Jones	John Addison
1964	Cleopatra	Alex North
1964	Lawrence of Arabia	Maurice Jarre
1964	Mondo Cane	Riz Ortolani
1965
1965	Mary Poppins	Richard M. Sherman and Robert B. Sherman
1965	Goldfinger	John Barry
1965	A Hard Day's Night	John Lennon and Paul McCartney
1965	The Pink Panther	Henry Mancini
1965	Robin and the 7 Hoods	Sammy Cahn and Jimmy Van Heusen
1966
1966	The Sandpiper	Johnny Mandel
1966	Help!	John Lennon, Paul McCartney, George Harrison and Ken Thorne
1966	The Man from U.N.C.L.E.	Lalo Schifrin, Morton Stevens, Walter Scharf and Jerry Goldsmith
1966	The Umbrellas of Cherbourg	Michel Legrand and Jacques Demy
1966	Zorba the Greek	Mikis Theodorakis
1967
1967	Doctor Zhivago	Maurice Jarre
1967	Alfie	Sonny Rollins
1967	Arabesque	Henry Mancini
1967	Born Free	John Barry
1967	Who's Afraid of Virginia Woolf?	Alex North
1968
1968	Mission: Impossible	Lalo Schifrin
1968	Casino Royale	Burt Bacharach
1968	Doctor Dolittle	Leslie Bricusse
1968	In the Heat of the Night	Quincy Jones
1968	To Sir, with Love	Ron Grainer, Don Black and Mark London
1969
1969	The Graduate	Dave Grusin and Paul Simon
1969	Bonnie and Clyde	Charles Strouse
1969	The Fox	Lalo Schifrin
1969	The Odd Couple	Neal Hefti
1969	Valley of the Dolls	André Previn

=== 1970s ===
Year^{[I]}	Work	Artist
1970
1970	Butch Cassidy and the Sundance Kid	Burt Bacharach
1970	The Lost Man	Quincy Jones
1970	Mackenna's Gold	Quincy Jones
1970	Me, Natalie	Henry Mancini
1970	Yellow Submarine	John Lennon, Paul McCartney, George Harrison and George Martin
1971
1971	Let It Be	The Beatles (Note: John Lennon, Paul McCartney, George Harrison and Ringo Starr)
1971	Airport	Alfred Newman
1971	Darling Lili	Johnny Mercer and Henry Mancini
1971	M*A*S*H	Johnny Mandel
1971	The Sterile Cuckoo	Fred Karlin
1972
1972	Shaft	Isaac Hayes
1972	Bless the Beasts and Children	Barry De Vorzon and Perry Botkin Jr.
1972	Friends	Elton John and Bernie Taupin
1972	Love Story	Francis Lai
1972	Ryan's Daughter	Maurice Jarre
1973
1973	The Godfather	Nino Rota
1973	$	Quincy Jones
1973	Il Giardino dei Finzi-Contini	Manuel De Sica
1973	Nicholas and Alexandra	Richard Rodney Bennett
1973	Super Fly	Curtis Mayfield
1974
1974	Jonathan Livingston Seagull	Neil Diamond
1974	Last Tango in Paris	Gato Barbieri
1974	Live and Let Die	Paul McCartney, Linda McCartney and George Martin
1974	Pat Garrett & Billy the Kid	Bob Dylan
1974	Sounder	Taj Mahal
1975
1975	The Way We Were	Alan and Marilyn Bergman and Marvin Hamlisch
1975	Death Wish	Herbie Hancock
1975	QB VII	Jerry Goldsmith
1975	Serpico	Mikis Theodorakis
1975	The Three Musketeers	Michel Legrand
1976
1976	Jaws	John Williams
1976	Murder on the Orient Express	Richard Rodney Bennett
1976	Nashville	Keith Carradine, Ronee Blakley, Richard Baskin, Ben Raleigh, Richard Reicheg, Henry Gibson and Karen Black
1976	The Return of the Pink Panther	Henry Mancini
1976	The Wind and the Lion	Jerry Goldsmith
1977
1977	Car Wash	Norman Whitfield
1977	The Omen	Jerry Goldsmith
1977	One Flew Over the Cuckoo's Nest	Jack Nitzsche
1977	Rich Man, Poor Man	Alex North
1977	Taxi Driver	Bernard Herrmann
1978
1978	Star Wars	John Williams
1978	Rocky	Bill Conti
1978	The Spy Who Loved Me	Marvin Hamlisch
1978	A Star Is Born	Kenny Ascher, Alan Bergman, Marilyn Bergman, Rupert Holmes, Leon Russell, Barbra Streisand, Donna Weiss, Paul Williams and Kenny Loggins
1978	You Light Up My Life	Joe Brooks
1979
1979	Close Encounters of the Third Kind	John Williams
1979	Battlestar Galactica	Stu Phillips, John Andrew Tartaglia, Sue Collins and Glen A. Larson
1979	Holocaust	Morton Gould
1979	Midnight Express	Giorgio Moroder, Chris Bennett, David Castle, Billy Hayes and Oliver Stone
1979	Revenge of the Pink Panther	Henry Mancini and Leslie Bricusse

=== 1980s ===
Year^{[I]}	Work	Artist
1980
1980	Superman	John Williams
1980	Alien	Jerry Goldsmith
1980	Apocalypse Now	Carmine Coppola and Francis Ford Coppola
1980	Ice Castles	Alan Parsons, Eric Woolfson, Marvin Hamlisch and Carole Bayer Sager (lyricist)
1980	The Muppet Movie	Paul Williams and Kenny Ascher
1981
1981	The Empire Strikes Back	John Williams
1981	Fame	Michael Gore, Anthony Evans, Paul McCrane, Dean Pitchford, Lesley Gore and Robert F. Colesberry
1981	Journey Through the Secret Life of Plants	Stevie Wonder, Michael Sembello, Stephanie Andrews and Yvonne Wright
1981	One-Trick Pony	Paul Simon
1981	Urban Cowboy	JD Souther, Boz Scaggs, David Foster, Jerry Foster, Bill Rice, Brian Collins, Robby Campbell, Joe Walsh, Bob Morrison, Johnny Wilson, Dan Fogelberg, Bob Seger, Wayland Holyfield, Bob House, Wanda Mallette and Patti Ryan
1982
1982	Raiders of the Lost Ark	John Williams
1982	9 to 5	Charles Fox and Dolly Parton
1982	The Elephant Man	John Morris
1982	Endless Love	Jonathan Tunick, Lionel Richie and Thomas McClary
1982	The Jazz Singer	Neil Diamond, Gilbert Bécaud, Alan E. Lindgren, Richard Bennett and Doug Rhone
1983
1983	E.T. the Extra-Terrestrial	John Williams
1983	The French Lieutenant's Woman	Carl Davis
1983	On Golden Pond	Dave Grusin
1983	Ragtime	Randy Newman
1983	Victor/Victoria	Henry Mancini and Leslie Bricusse
1984
1984	Flashdance	Various artists (Note: For Flashdance, various artists include Michael Boddicker, Irene Cara, Kim Carnes, Doug Cotler, Keith Forsey, Richard Gilbert, Jerry Hey, Duane Hitchings, Craig Krampf, Ronald Magness, Dennis Matkosky, Giorgio Moroder, Phil Ramone, Michael Sembello and Shandi Sinnamon)
1984	Gandhi	Ravi Shankar and George Fenton
1984	Return of the Jedi	John Williams
1984	Staying Alive	Frank Stallone, Bruce Stephen Foster, Roy Freeland, Vince DiCola, Thomas Marolda, Joe Esposito, Randy Bishop, Tommy Faragher, Barry Gibb, Maurice Gibb and Robin Gibb
1984	Tootsie	Dave Grusin
1985
1985	Purple Rain	Prince and The Revolution
1985	Against All Odds	Phil Collins, Stevie Nicks, Peter Gabriel, Stuart Adamson, Mike Rutherford, Kid Creole, Michel Colombier and Larry Carlton
1985	Footloose	Bill Wolfer, Dean Pitchford, Kenny Loggins, Tom Snow, Sammy Hagar, Michael Gore, Eric Carmen and Jim Steinman
1985	Ghostbusters	Ray Parker Jr., Kevin O'Neal, Bobby Alessi, David Immer, Tom Bailey, Graham Russell, David Foster, Jay Graydon, Diane Warren, Mick Smiley and Elmer Bernstein
1985	Yentl	Michel Legrand, Alan Bergman and Marilyn Bergman
1986
1986	Beverly Hills Cop	Various artists (Note: For Beverly Hills Cop, various artists include Marc Benno, Harold Faltermeyer, Keith Forsey, Micki Free, John Gilutin Hawk, Howard Hewett, Bunny Hull, Howie Rice, Sharon Robinson, Danny Sembello, Sue Sheridan, Richard Theisen and Allee Willis)
1986	Back to the Future	Johnny Colla, Chris Hayes, Huey Lewis, Lindsey Buckingham, Alan Silvestri, Eric Clapton and Sean Hopper
1986	A Passage to India	Maurice Jarre
1986	St. Elmo's Fire	David Foster, John Parr, Billy Squier, John Elefante, Dino Elefante, Jon Anderson, Fee Waybill, Steve Lukather, Richard Marx, Jay Graydon, Steve Kipner, Peter Beckett and Cynthia Weil
1986	Witness	Maurice Jarre
1987
1987	Out of Africa	John Barry (film music was nominated in the Best Instrumental Composition category)
1987	Aliens	James Horner
1987	Earth Run	Lee Ritenour and Dave Grusin
1987	Elektric City	Chick Corea
1987	J Mood	Wynton Marsalis
1987	"Top Gun Anthem" (from Top Gun)	Harold Faltermeyer
1987	Young Sherlock Holmes	Bruce Broughton
1988
1988	The Untouchables	Ennio Morricone
1988	An American Tail	James Horner
1988	The Glass Menagerie	Henry Mancini
1988	The Princess Bride	Mark Knopfler
1988	The Witches of Eastwick	John Williams
1989
1989	The Last Emperor	Various artists (Note: For The Last Emperor, various artists include David Byrne, Cong Su and Ryuichi Sakamoto)
1989	Empire of the Sun	John Williams
1989	Fatal Attraction	Maurice Jarre
1989	Tucker: The Man and His Dream	Joe Jackson
1989	Who Framed Roger Rabbit	Alan Silvestri

=== 1990s ===
Year^{[I]}	Work	Artist
1990
1990	The Fabulous Baker Boys	Dave Grusin
1990	Batman	Danny Elfman
1990	Field of Dreams	James Horner
1990	Indiana Jones and the Last Crusade	John Williams
1990	The Last Temptation of Christ	Peter Gabriel
1991
1991	Glory	James Horner
1991	Dick Tracy	Danny Elfman
1991	Driving Miss Daisy	Hans Zimmer
1991	The Little Mermaid	Alan Menken
1991	Twin Peaks	Angelo Badalamenti
1992
1992	Dances with Wolves	John Barry
1992	Avalon	Randy Newman
1992	Awakenings	Randy Newman
1992	Edward Scissorhands	Danny Elfman
1992	Havana	Dave Grusin
1992	Robin Hood: Prince of Thieves	Michael Kamen
1993
1993	Beauty and the Beast	Alan Menken
1993	Hook	John Williams
1993	The Mambo Kings	Arturo Sandoval
1993	Northern Exposure	David Schwartz
1993	Rush	Eric Clapton
1994
1994	Aladdin	Alan Menken
1994	The Age of Innocence	Elmer Bernstein
1994	The Firm	Dave Grusin
1994	Jurassic Park	John Williams
1994	A River Runs Through It	Mark Isham
1995
1995	Schindler's List	John Williams
1995	The Lion King	Hans Zimmer
1995	Little Buddha	Ryuichi Sakamoto
1995	The Shawshank Redemption	Thomas Newman
1995	Wolf	Ennio Morricone
1996
1996	Crimson Tide	Hans Zimmer
1996	Batman Forever	Elliot Goldenthal
1996	The Cure	Dave Grusin
1996	Ed Wood	Howard Shore
1996	Joe Cool's Blues	Wynton Marsalis
1997
1997	Independence Day	David Arnold
1997	Get Shorty	John Lurie
1997	The Star Maker	Ennio Morricone
1997	A Time to Kill	Elliot Goldenthal
1997	Unstrung Heroes	Thomas Newman
1998
1998	The English Patient	Gabriel Yared
1998	The Lost World: Jurassic Park	John Williams
1998	Men in Black	Danny Elfman
1998	Selena	Dave Grusin
1998	Seven Years in Tibet	John Williams
1999
1999	Saving Private Ryan	John Williams
1999	Amistad	John Williams
1999	Bulworth	Ennio Morricone
1999	City of Angels	Gabriel Yared
1999	Rush Hour	Lalo Schifrin

=== 2000s ===
Year^{[I]}	Work	Artist
2000
2000	A Bug's Life	Randy Newman
2000	Life Is Beautiful	Nicola Piovani
2000	The Red Violin	John Corigliano
2000	Shakespeare in Love	Stephen Warbeck
2000	Star Wars: Episode I – The Phantom Menace	John Williams
2001
2001	American Beauty	Thomas Newman (artist/composer/producer) and Bill Bernstein (producer)
2001	The Cider House Rules	Rachel Portman
2001	Gladiator	Lisa Gerrard and Hans Zimmer
2001	Magnolia	Jon Brion
2001	Toy Story 2	Randy Newman
2002
2002	Crouching Tiger, Hidden Dragon	Tan Dun (artist/composer/producer), Steven Epstein (producer) and Richard King (engineer/mixer)
2002	A.I. Artificial Intelligence	John Williams
2002	Chocolat	Rachel Portman
2002	Men of Honor	Mark Isham
2002	Planet of the Apes	Danny Elfman
2002	Traffic	Cliff Martinez
2003
2003	The Lord of the Rings: The Fellowship of the Ring	Howard Shore (artist/composer/producer) and John Kurlander (engineer/mixer)
2003	A Beautiful Mind	James Horner
2003	Harry Potter and the Sorcerer's Stone	John Williams
2003	Monsters, Inc.	Randy Newman
2003	Spider-Man	Danny Elfman
2004
2004	The Lord of the Rings: The Two Towers	Howard Shore (artist/composer/producer), John Kurlander (engineer) and Peter Cobbin (engineer/mixer)
2004	Catch Me If You Can	John Williams
2004	Harry Potter and the Chamber of Secrets	John Williams
2004	The Hours	Philip Glass
2004	Seabiscuit	Randy Newman
2005
2005	The Lord of the Rings: The Return of the King	Howard Shore (artist/composer/producer) and John Kurlander (engineer/mixer)
2005	Angels in America	Thomas Newman
2005	Big Fish	Danny Elfman
2005	Eternal Sunshine of the Spotless Mind	Jon Brion
2005	Harry Potter and the Prisoner of Azkaban	John Williams
2006
2006	Ray	Craig Armstrong (composer/producer), David Donaldson (producer), Taylor Hackford (producer) and Geoff Foster (engineer/mixer)
2006	The Aviator	Howard Shore
2006	The Incredibles	Michael Giacchino
2006	Million Dollar Baby	Clint Eastwood
2006	Star Wars: Episode III – Revenge of the Sith	John Williams
2007
2007	Memoirs of a Geisha	John Williams (artist/composer) and Shawn Murphy (engineer/mixer)
2007	The Chronicles of Narnia: The Lion, the Witch and the Wardrobe	Harry Gregson-Williams
2007	The Da Vinci Code	Hans Zimmer
2007	Munich	John Williams
2007	Pirates of the Caribbean: Dead Man's Chest	Hans Zimmer
2008
2008	Ratatouille	Michael Giacchino
2008	Babel	Gustavo Santaolalla
2008	Blood Diamond	James Newton Howard
2008	The Departed	Howard Shore
2008	Happy Feet	John Powell
2008	Pan's Labyrinth	Javier Navarrete
2009
2009	The Dark Knight	Hans Zimmer and James Newton Howard
2009	Indiana Jones and the Kingdom of the Crystal Skull	John Williams
2009	Iron Man	Ramin Djawadi
2009	There Will Be Blood	Jonny Greenwood
2009	WALL-E	Thomas Newman

=== 2010s ===
Year^{[I]}	Work	Artist
2010
2010	Up	Michael Giacchino
2010	The Curious Case of Benjamin Button	Alexandre Desplat
2010	Harry Potter and the Half-Blood Prince	Nicholas Hooper
2010	Milk	Danny Elfman
2010	Star Trek	Michael Giacchino
2011
2011	Toy Story 3	Randy Newman
2011	Alice in Wonderland	Danny Elfman
2011	Avatar	James Horner
2011	Inception	Hans Zimmer
2011	Sherlock Holmes	Hans Zimmer
2012
2012	The King's Speech	Alexandre Desplat
2012	Black Swan	Clint Mansell
2012	Harry Potter and the Deathly Hallows – Part 2	Alexandre Desplat
2012	The Shrine	Ryan Shore
2012	Tron: Legacy	Daft Punk
2013
2013	The Girl with the Dragon Tattoo	Trent Reznor and Atticus Ross
2013	The Adventures of Tintin	John Williams
2013	The Artist	Ludovic Bource
2013	The Dark Knight Rises	Hans Zimmer
2013	Hugo	Howard Shore
2013	Journey	Austin Wintory
2014
2014	Skyfall	Thomas Newman
2014	Argo	Alexandre Desplat
2014	The Great Gatsby	Craig Armstrong
2014	Life of Pi	Mychael Danna
2014	Lincoln	John Williams
2014	Zero Dark Thirty	Alexandre Desplat
2015
2015	The Grand Budapest Hotel	Alexandre Desplat
2015	Frozen	Christophe Beck
2015	Gone Girl	Trent Reznor and Atticus Ross
2015	Gravity	Steven Price
2015	Saving Mr. Banks	Thomas Newman
2016
2016	Birdman	Antonio Sánchez
2016	The Imitation Game	Alexandre Desplat
2016	Interstellar	Hans Zimmer
2016	The Theory of Everything	Jóhann Jóhannsson
2016	Whiplash	Justin Hurwitz
2017
2017	Star Wars: The Force Awakens	John Williams
2017	Bridge of Spies	Thomas Newman
2017	The Hateful Eight	Ennio Morricone
2017	The Revenant	Alva Noto and Ryuichi Sakamoto
2017	Stranger Things, Vol. 1	Kyle Dixon and Michael Stein
2017	Stranger Things, Vol. 2	Kyle Dixon and Michael Stein
2018
2018	La La Land	Justin Hurwitz
2018	Arrival	Jóhann Jóhannsson
2018	Dunkirk	Hans Zimmer
2018	Game of Thrones: Season 7	Ramin Djawadi
2018	Hidden Figures	Benjamin Wallfisch, Pharrell Williams and Hans Zimmer
2019
2019	Black Panther	Ludwig Göransson
2019	Blade Runner 2049	Benjamin Wallfisch and Hans Zimmer
2019	Coco	Michael Giacchino
2019	The Shape of Water	Alexandre Desplat
2019	Star Wars: The Last Jedi	John Williams

=== 2020s ===
Year^{[I]}	Work	Artist
2020
2020	Chernobyl	Hildur Guðnadóttir
2020	Avengers: Endgame	Alan Silvestri
2020	Game of Thrones: Season 8	Ramin Djawadi
2020	The Lion King	Hans Zimmer
2020	Mary Poppins Returns	Marc Shaiman
2021
2021	Joker	Hildur Guðnadóttir
2021	1917	Thomas Newman
2021	Ad Astra	Max Richter
2021	Becoming	Kamasi Washington
2021	Star Wars: The Rise of Skywalker	John Williams
2022
2022	The Queen's Gambit (TIE)	Carlos Rafael Rivera
2022	Soul (TIE)	Jon Batiste, Trent Reznor and Atticus Ross
2022	Bridgerton: Season 1	Kris Bowers
2022	Dune	Hans Zimmer
2022	The Mandalorian Season 2 – Vol. 2 (Chapters 13-16)	Ludwig Göransson
2023
2023	Encanto	Germaine Franco
2023	The Batman	Michael Giacchino
2023	No Time to Die	Hans Zimmer
2023	The Power of the Dog	Jonny Greenwood
2023	Succession: Season 3	Nicholas Britell
2024
2024	Oppenheimer	Ludwig Göransson
2024	Barbie	Mark Ronson and Andrew Wyatt
2024	Black Panther: Wakanda Forever	Ludwig Göransson
2024	The Fabelmans	John Williams
2024	Indiana Jones and the Dial of Destiny	John Williams
2025
2025	Dune: Part Two	Hans Zimmer
2025	American Fiction	Laura Karpman
2025	Challengers	Trent Reznor and Atticus Ross
2025	The Color Purple	Kris Bowers
2025	Shógun	Nick Chuba, Atticus Ross and Leopold Ross
2026
2026	Sinners	Ludwig Göransson
2026	How to Train Your Dragon	John Powell
2026	Severance: Season 2	Theodore Shapiro
2026	Wicked	John Powell and Stephen Schwartz
2026	The Wild Robot	Kris Bowers
2027	The Odyssey	Ludwig Göransson
2027	One Battle After Another	Jonny Greenwood
2027	Project Hail Mary	Daniel Pemberton
2027	Star Wars: The Mandalorian and Grogu	Ludwig Göransson
2027	Widow's Bay	David Fleming

== Name changes ==
There have been several minor changes to the name of the award:

Year	Name
1959	Best Sound Track Album – Background Score from a Motion Picture or Television
1961–62	Best Sound Track Album or Recording of Music Score from Motion Picture or Television
1964–68	Best Original Score from a Motion Picture or Television Show
1969–73 1978	Best Original Score Written for a Motion Picture or Television Special
1974–77	Best Album of Best Original Score Written for a Motion Picture or Television Special
1979–86	Best Album of Original Score Written for a Motion Picture or Television Special
1988–90	Best Album of Original Instrumental Background Score Written for a Motion Picture or Television
1991–99	Best Instrumental Composition Written for a Motion Picture or Television
2000	Best Instrumental Composition Written for a Motion Picture, Television or Other Visual Media
2001–11	Best Score Soundtrack Album for Motion Picture, Television, or Other Visual Media
2012–2022	Best Score Soundtrack for Visual Media
2023–	Best Score Soundtrack for Visual Media (Includes Film and Television)

== Multiple wins ==
11 wins

- John Williams (6 consecutive)

3 wins

- Ludwig Göransson
- Howard Shore (consecutive)
- Hans Zimmer

2 wins

- Alexandre Desplat
- Michael Giacchino
- Dave Grusin
- Hildur Guðnadóttir (consecutive)
- Alan Menken (consecutive)
- Randy Newman
- Thomas Newman
- Trent Reznor
- Atticus Ross

== Multiple nominations ==
36 nominations

- John Williams

18 nominations

- Hans Zimmer

11 nominations

- Henry Mancini

9 nominations

- Danny Elfman
- Dave Grusin
- Thomas Newman

8 nominations

- Alexandre Desplat
- Randy Newman

7 nominations

- Howard Shore
- Ludwig Göransson

6 nominations

- Michael Giacchino
- James Horner
- Maurice Jarre

5 nominations

- Jerry Goldsmith
- Paul McCartney
- Ennio Morricone
- Atticus Ross

4 nominations

- John Lennon
- Quincy Jones
- Trent Reznor
- Lalo Schifrin

3 nominations

- John Barry
- Alan and Marilyn Bergman
- Kris Bowers
- Leslie Bricusse
- Ramin Djawadi
- Jonny Greenwood
- Marvin Hamlisch
- George Harrison
- Michel Legrand
- Alan Menken
- Alex North
- John Powell
- Ryuichi Sakamoto
- Alan Silvestri

== See also ==
- BAFTA Award for Best Original Music
- Academy Award for Best Original Score
- Critics' Choice Movie Award for Best Score
- Golden Globe Award for Best Original Score
- Grammy Award for Best Compilation Soundtrack for Visual Media
- Primetime Emmy Award for Outstanding Music Composition for a Series
- Primetime Emmy Award for Outstanding Music Composition for a Documentary Series or Special
- Primetime Emmy Award for Outstanding Music Composition for a Limited or Anthology Series, Movie or Special
