= The Ides of March (soundtrack) =

The Ides of March (Original Motion Picture Soundtrack)

Film score by Alexandre Desplat
- Released: September 27, 2011
- Genre: Film score
- Length: 38:48
- Label: Varèse Sarabande
- Producer: Alexandre Desplat

Alexandre Desplat chronology
Harry Potter and the Deathly Hallows – Part 2 (2011)	The Ides of March (2011)	Carnage (2011)

The Ides of March (Original Motion Picture Soundtrack) is the score album to the 2011 film The Ides of March directed by George Clooney. The film score is composed by Alexandre Desplat, who would later collaborate with Clooney on his other directorial ventures, The Monuments Men (2014), Suburbicon (2017) and The Midnight Sky (2020). The score was released by Varèse Sarabande on September 27, 2011.

== Development ==
"It's always easy to come on to a project when the director likes your music and knows your work. Everything seems kind of easier. My exchange with George [Clooney] was fruitful. He knows what he's doing and has a strong point of view. Otherwise he wouldn't be a great director. When I composed he would be near me at the piano in my studio. He is enthusiastic and always positive."

— Alexandre Desplat, on working with George Clooney

In April 2011, Alexandre Desplat was announced as the music composer. Desplat had composed for Clooney's films as an actor which includes Syriana (2005) and Fantastic Mr. Fox (2009); he commented that Clooney apart from being professional, has a great love for music, and also recalled that Clooney would guide him on the decisions of the instrumentation and placing the cues for the appropriate sequences. Desplat had felt that the earlier political films of the 1970s, such as All the President's Men (1976) did not have much music, hence "it was a challenge not to overwhelm the movie with music and build tension as the movie is going on".

The origins of the title refers to March, which is the month of Mars, the god of war in Roman mythology. Hence, war and betrayal were the subtext in the film as Desplat used lot of drums to bring the warlike feel. Apart from that, Desplat commented that doubt is also another strong element, where doubt "allows someone to betray his friends and allies, the doubt that he's on the right side". The instrumentation had to capture the fragility for that. He further commented "On the surface, the governor is the perfect married man. But later, the integrity of the man that was all these things is gone, and you try to create suspense and a lot of it is with the timpani and drums, a rhythm motive that always comes back in the film."

Desplat liked the opening and ending motifs as, he usually wanted to work on bringing the audience into the story. For the opening motif, he polished those pieces to get them right, and in the conclusion, the same motif was played from beginning, which was extremely slowed down and used strings for the piece. Desplat said "It is when we are following Steven [Ryan Gosling] who is now the head of the campaign, and his rise to power is now achieved. But because of how he achieved his rise to power, by betraying everyone, it plays as almost an adagio – almost like a death march. When he's at the top of his game, the music contradicts that."

== Track listing ==
No.	Title	Length
1.	"The Ides Of March"	2:04
2.	"Undercurrents"	3:51
3.	"Behind The Flag"	1:47
4.	"Paranoia"	1:27
5.	"The Candidate"	4:09
6.	"Molly's Solitude"	3:53
7.	"Doubt"	2:05
8.	"Molly"	2:27
9.	"Zara Vs. Duffy"	2:21
10.	"The Intern"	2:02
11.	"Stephen Meyers"	1:15
12.	"The Betrayal"	2:15
13.	"Lobbying"	4:45
14.	"Fired"	1:47
15.	"The Campaign"	2:40
Total length:		38:48

== Reception ==
Professional ratings
Review scores
Source	Rating
AllMusic	link

Writing for AllMusic, James Christopher Monger felt that Desplat provides "the appropriate gravitas, crafting a taut, emotional score that manages a deft balance of atmosphere and melody, blending traditional orchestral cues with late-night chamber music peppered with hints of jazz". He further wrote "Desplat manages to infuse the aristocratic feel of his work on The King's Speech and The Queen with a patina of soldierly Americana, trading in booming timpanis for military snares and stoic French horns for lonesome trumpets." James Southall of Movie Wave wrote "The Ides of March is another fine achievement by the composer, a dramatic and memorable work which can be added to the ever-increasing list of impressive music to come from his pen." Justin Chang of Variety called it as a "brooding, busy score" while A. O. Scott of The New York Times and Anthony Lane of The New Yorker complimented the score as "dark-hued" and "inoffensive". The Hollywood Reporter commented "Alexandre Desplat's evocative yet unprepossessing soundtrack follows suit." It was intended to be the possible contenders for Best Original Score at the 84th Academy Awards.

== Accolades ==
Awards Group	Category	Recipients and nominees	Result
World Soundtrack Awards 2012	Best Score of the Year	Alexandre Desplat	Nominated
World Soundtrack Awards 2012	Best Soundtrack Composer of the Year	Alexandre Desplat	Nominated

== Personnel ==
Credits adapted from CD liner notes.

- Composer, producer, conductor and orchestrator – Alexandre Desplat
- Drums – Ralph Salmins
- Electric cello – Vincent Segal
- Piano – Dave Hartley
- Concertmaster – Stephanie Gonley
- Copyist – Claude Romano, Norbert Vergonjanne
- Music editor – Del Spiva
- Supervising music editor – Gerard McCann
- Assistant engineer – Aled Jenkins
- Auricle operator – Peter Clarke
- Pro-tools operator – Gordon Davidson
- Executive producer – Robert Townson
- Management – Marc Stevens
- Mastering – Patricia Sullivan
- Mixing – Peter Cobbin
- Orchestra – The London Symphony Orchestra
- Additional orchestration – Jean-Pascal Beintus, Nicolas Charron, Sylvain Morizet
- Programming – Xavier Forcioli
- Recording – Andrew Dudman, Sam OKell
- Music supervisor – Linda Cohen
- Technician – Lewis Morrison
