= Harry Potter and the Deathly Hallows – Part 1 (disambiguation) =

Harry Potter and the Deathly Hallows – Part 1 is a 2010 fantasy film, based on the 2007 novel, and the seventh film installment in the Harry Potter franchise.

It may also refer to:

- Harry Potter and the Deathly Hallows – Part 1 (video game), a video game based on the film
- Harry Potter and the Deathly Hallows – Part 1 (soundtrack), the soundtrack to the 2010 film

== See also ==
- Deathly Hallows (disambiguation)
- Harry Potter and the Deathly Hallows – Part 2 (disambiguation)
