= Glory (soundtrack) =

1990 film score by James Horner

Glory: Original Motion Picture Soundtrack

Film score by James Horner
- Released: January 11, 1990
- Genre: Film score
- Length: 43:21
- Label: Virgin
- Producers: James Horner; Shawn Murphy

James Horner chronology
Dad (1989)	Glory: Original Motion Picture Soundtrack (1990)	I Love You to Death (1990)

Glory: Original Motion Picture Soundtrack (Expanded Edition)

Film score by James Horner
- Released: September 14, 2021
- Genre: Film score
- Length: 2:02:56
- Label: La-La Land Records
- Producers: James Horner; Shawn Murphy

Glory: Original Motion Picture Soundtrack is the soundtrack to the 1989 film of the same name directed by Edward Zwick, featuring a musical score composed, conducted and orchestrated by James Horner in association with the Boys Choir of Harlem. The score was met with critical acclaim, being assessed as one among Horner's best works; it received a nomination for the Golden Globe Award for Best Original Score and won the Grammy Award for Best Instrumental Composition Written for a Motion Picture or for Television in 1991.

The original score was first issued by Virgin Records on January 11, 1990. The initial release only consisted twelve tracks—seven in "Side A" and five in "Side B"—omitting the full score in its entirety, which resulted in several bootleg recordings of the full score. On September 14, 2021, La-La Land Records released the "expanded edition" of the soundtrack which contains the full score, with the tracks featured in the initial release and alternative cues of the score.

== Background ==
Horner recalled in a speech to University of California, Los Angeles in 1992 saying that Zwick wanted a Civil War score where he would write most of the themes on the piano. He wrote a "beautiful" theme which Zwick felt that it was in a wrong film, set for Summer of '42 (1971) but Horner did not see it as a love theme and instead as a yearning theme. Horner used brass themes to capture the war sequences, and the Los Angeles choral group Boys Choir of Harlem performed the score for most of the tracks.

== Reception ==
The score has been hailed by critics as one of Horner's best. Music critic Jonathan Broxton reviewed "Glory is a cornerstone James Horner score, is an absolutely essential part of every discerning fan’s collection". James Southall of Movie Wave wrote that Horner combines "the big emotions with a huge dramatic sweep" giving a 5-star rating to the album. Filmtracks.com also gave a five-star rating to the album, commenting "No matter which album you ultimately enjoy more, Glory will always stand among Horner's top career works, and it prevails to this day as one of the most effectively engaging and heartbreaking scores of its era." Stephen Thomas Erlewine called the score as "tense, melodramatic and uplifting" as the film. Giving a 5-star rating, Sputnikmusic complimented it as an "emotionally charged score".

== Track listing ==
=== Original release ===
All music is composed by James Horner.

Side A
No.	Title	Length
1.	"A Call to Arms"	3:08
2.	"After Antietam"	2:40
3.	"Lonely Christmas"	1:55
4.	"Forming the Regiment"	5:26
5.	"The Whipping"	2:09
6.	"Burning the Town of Darien"	2:31
7.	"Brave Words, Braver Deeds"	3:10

Side B
No.	Title	Length
1.	"The Year of Jubilee"	2:26
2.	"Preparations for Battle"	7:35
3.	"Charging Fort Wagner"	2:53
4.	"An Epitaph to War"	2:34
5.	"Closing Credits"	6:52

=== Expanded edition ===
All music is composed by James Horner, except where noted.

Disc 1: Score Presentation / Source Music
No.	Title	Writer(s)	Length
1.	"A Call to Arms"		3:18
2.	"After Antietam" (Film Version)		2:29
3.	"Flashback"		0:45
4.	"Forming the Regiment" (Film Version)		3:44
5.	"Jefferson & Liberty" (Full Version)		2:03
6.	"The Decision / Second Flashback"		2:34
7.	"Lonely Christmas"		1:56
8.	"The Whipping"		2:12
9.	"New Shoes"		1:16
10.	"Worth a Life"		1:28
11.	"The Year of Jubilee" (Film Version)		2:29
12.	"Burning the Town of Darien"		2:34
13.	"Our Time"		1:54
14.	"The Battle of Grimball's Landing"		3:19
15.	"Promise Me / What Do You Want of Us?"		1:42
16.	"Brave Words and Deeds"		3:11
17.	"Preparations for Battle" (Film Version)		7:42
18.	"Charging Fort Wagner"		2:54
19.	"An Epitaph to War" (Full Version)		2:35
20.	"Closing Credits" (Film Mix)		6:58
21.	"Drei Klavierstücke, DV.946"	Franz Schubert	2:31
22.	"Jefferson & Liberty"		1:00
23.	"Old 1812"		1:14
24.	"Jefferson & Liberty" (Film Mix)		1:25
25.	"Hoist the Flag"		2:!9
26.	"The Sicilian Circle"		1:54
27.	"The Bonnie Blue Flag"		1:17

Disc 2: Original Soundtrack Album / Additional Music
No.	Title	Length
1.	"A Call to Arms"	3:10
2.	"After Antietam"	2:40
3.	"Lonely Christmas"	1:55
4.	"Forming the Regiment"	5:27
5.	"The Whipping"	2:09
6.	"Burning the Town of Darien"	2:31
7.	"Brave Words, Braver Deeds"	3:10
8.	"The Year of Jubilee"	2:26
9.	"Preparations for Battle"	7:35
10.	"Charging Fort Wagner"	2:53
11.	"An Epitaph to War"	2:35
12.	"Closing Credits"	6:58
13.	"A Call to Arms" (With Wild Opening)	3:31
14.	"Flashback" (Alternate No. 1)	0:44
15.	"Worth a Life" (Alternate No. 1)	1:25
16.	"Flashback" (Alternate No. 2)	0:43
17.	"Worth a Life" (Alternate No. 2)	1:24
18.	"Charging Fort Wagner" (Alternate)	2:55

== Accolades ==
Despite being acclaimed by critics, the original score for Glory did not receive a nomination at the 62nd Academy Awards, A complete list of awards the film won or was nominated for are listed below. although Horner's score for Field of Dreams did receive a nomination. The album was nominated by American Film Institute for AFI's 100 Years of Film Scores.

Award	Category	Nominee	Result
47th Golden Globe Awards	Best Original Score	James Horner	Nominated
33rd Grammy Awards	Best Instrumental Composition Written for a Motion Picture or for Television	James Horner	Won
