= American Beauty (score) =

American Beauty: Original Motion Picture Score

Film score by Thomas Newman
- Released: January 11, 2000
- Recorded: 1999
- Studios: Signet Sound Studios (Los Angeles, California), Todd-AO Scoring Stage (Studio City, California)
- Genres: Film score Instrumental; Ambient music
- Length: 37:24
- Label: DreamWorks Records
- Producer: Bill Bernstein

Professional ratings
Review scores
Source	Rating
Allmusic	4.5/5 stars
Filmtracks	3/5 stars

American Beauty: Original Motion Picture Score is the recording of the original score for the 1999 film, composed and conducted by Thomas Newman. The original music accompanied 11 songs by other artists.

== Description ==
The film was nominated for the Academy Award for Original Music Score and the Golden Globe Award for Best Original Score and won the Anthony Asquith Award for Film Music in the BAFTA Awards.

The score album won the Grammy Award for the Best Score Soundtrack Album for a Motion Picture, Television or other Visual Media in 2001 which was awarded to producer Bill Bernstein, engineer Dennis Sands, and Newman.

A soundtrack album for the film was also released, on October 5, 1999, entitled American Beauty: Music from the Original Motion Picture Soundtrack. That album includes songs by ten of the eleven artists (Annie Lennox's rendition of "Don't Let It Bring You Down" being absent) and two excerpts from the film's score: "Dead Already" and "Any Other Name".

== Track listing ==
All tracks are written by Thomas Newman.

No.	Title	Length
1.	"Dead Already"	3:18
2.	"Arose"	1:05
3.	"Power of Denial"	1:44
4.	"Lunch with the King"	2:25
5.	"Mental Boy"	1:43
6.	"Mr. Smarty-Man"	1:11
7.	"Root Beer"	1:05
8.	"American Beauty"	3:05
9.	"Bloodless Freak"	1:36
10.	"Choking the Bishop"	1:51
11.	"Weirdest Home Videos"	2:02
12.	"Structure and Discipline"	3:05
13.	"Spartanette"	0:59
14.	"Angela Undress"	1:43
15.	"Marine"	1:34
16.	"Walk Home"	1:19
17.	"Blood Red"	0:38
18.	"Any Other Name"	4:06
19.	"Still Dead"	2:46

== See also ==
- American Beauty
- American Beauty soundtrack
