= American Beauty (soundtrack) =

Soundtrack album by Various artists
- Released: October 5, 1999
- Genres: Rock, pop, instrumental
- Length: 46:20
- Label: DreamWorks
- Producers: Chris Douridis, Michael Ostin, Sam Mendes

Professional ratings
Review scores
Source	Rating
Allmusic	4.5/5 stars

American Beauty: Music from the Original Motion Picture Soundtrack is a soundtrack album featuring various artists for the 1999 American drama film American Beauty, released on October 5, 1999, by DreamWorks Records. It features two tracks from the film's original score, composed and arranged by Thomas Newman, which was released in 2000 entitled American Beauty: Original Motion Picture Score.

== Description ==
The soundtrack album was produced by Chris Douridas, Sam Mendes, and Michael Ostin. It was nominated for a Grammy Award for Best Compilation Soundtrack Album for a Motion Picture, Television or Other Visual Media in 2000, the year the award was established.

The soundtrack features two tracks from the film's score, composed and arranged by Thomas Newman, which won several awards. Elliott Smith's cover of the Beatles song "Because" was featured over the end credits for the film. The track "Dead Already" was later featured in the 2005 film Madagascar (which was also a film from DreamWorks Pictures).

Newman's "Dead Already" and "Any Other Name" were sampled by Jakatta for his house track "American Dream" in 2000.

The opening track "Dead Already" was used by the band Genesis during their 2007 Turn It On Again Tour and their 2021 The Last Domino? Tour as their intro music. It is also used in some aviation and airline travel media.

The closing track is an Annie Lennox rendition of Neil Young's "Don't Let It Bring You Down". It is also available on her 1995 album Medusa.

Some of the tracks such as "Dead Already" and "The Power of Denial" (both by Thomas Newman) were used in Pinoy Big Brother as part of the background music and nominations. "Dead Already" was also used as background music on À prendre ou à laisser, the French version of the television game show Deal or No Deal.

The 19-track Original Motion Picture Score of the film, entirely composed and arranged by Thomas Newman, was later released on January 11, 2000.

== Track listing ==
No.	Title	Artist	Length
1.	"Dead Already"	Thomas Newman	3:18
2.	"Because"	Elliott Smith	2:20
3.	"Free to Go"	The Folk Implosion	3:31
4.	"All Right Now"	Free	5:29
5.	"Use Me"	Bill Withers	3:45
6.	"Cancer for the Cure"	Eels	4:44
7.	"The Seeker"	The Who	3:23
8.	"Don't Rain on My Parade"	Bobby Darin	2:53
9.	"Open the Door"	Betty Carter	3:11
10.	"We Haven't Turned Around"	Gomez	6:28
11.	"Bali Ha'i"	Peggy Lee	3:10
12.	"Any Other Name"	Thomas Newman	4:05
13.	"Don't Let It Bring You Down"	Annie Lennox	3:40
