= Valley of the Dolls (soundtrack) =

Studio album by Various artists
- Released: 1967
- Recorded: 1967
- Genre: Pop
- Label: 20th Century Fox Records

Valley of the Dolls is a 1967 film soundtrack album released by 20th Century Fox Records, from the studio's film of the same name. It features several songs performed in the film, as well as the musical score by John Williams and Dory and André Previn.

== Background ==
The soundtrack was released in 1967. Dionne Warwick sang the title track, but her version is not on the soundtrack album, only on the actual film soundtrack. According to Susann, she wrote her own lyric for the film's title track as she felt that Dory Previn's lyric did not establish the story's background. Warwick was signed to Scepter Records at the time and could not contractually appear on the soundtrack album. Therefore, a re-recorded version appears on the LP Dionne Warwick in Valley of the Dolls. The film contains two versions of the theme song with different lyrics: one version plays over the opening credits, and the other, with the same lyrics as Warwick's recorded version, is heard towards the end of the film. Warwick performed the song on the January 29, 1968 episode of the CBS television variety series The Carol Burnett Show a month after the film was released.

Margaret Whiting recorded "I'll Plant My Own Tree" for the film, while Eileen Wilson recorded it for the soundtrack album. The song is dubbed for Susan Hayward, while "It's Impossible" and "Give a Little More" are both dubbed by Gaille Heidemann for Patty Duke. Heidemann and Wilson are uncredited on the soundtrack label.

The original version of "I'll Plant My Own Tree" (recorded by Judy Garland before she was fired from the film) was finally released in 1976 on a compilation LP, Cut! Outtakes from Hollywood's Greatest Musicals.

Lovely Me: The Life of Jacqueline Susann (1987) by Barbara Seaman states that Ruth Batchelor, who wrote lyrics for Elvis Presley, wrote the lyrics for a title song for the movie. Batchelor's song was rejected by the studio as the Previns had already written the soundtrack. It was recorded by The Arbors and used as the opening theme to the 1967 documentary "Jacqueline Susann and the Valley of the Dolls".

== Reception ==
Stephen Thomas Erlweine of AllMusic wrote: "Dory and André Previn's score for the kitsch classic Valley of the Dolls is a deliciously campy collection of swinging jazz and pop underpinned with humor and tongue-in-cheek sensuality. Like the film it supports, the music has dated -- it bears all the hallmarks of "hip" '60s pop culture, but that's not necessarily a bad thing".

== Track listing ==
1. "Theme from Valley of the Dolls" – 4:04 (vocal by Dory Previn; narration by Barbara Parkins)
2. "It's Impossible" – 2:12 (vocal by Gaille Heidemann for Patty Duke)
3. "Ann at Lawrenceville" – 2:37 (instrumental)
4. "Chance Meeting" – 2:31 (instrumental)
5. "Neely's Career Montage" – 1:59 (instrumental)
6. "Come Live with Me" – 2:01 (vocal by Tony Scotti)
7. "I'll Plant My Own Tree" – 2:24 (vocal by Eileen Wilson for Susan Hayward; Margaret Whiting dubbed Susan Hayward in the film, but she was under contract to a different label, so veteran voice double Eileen Wilson sings "I'll Plant My Own Tree" on the soundtrack album)
8. "The Gillian Girl Commercial" – 2:04 (instrumental)
9. "Jennifer's French Movie" – 2:26 (instrumental)
10. "Give a Little More" – 2:02 (vocal by Gaille Heidemann for Patty Duke)
11. "Jennifer's Recollection" – 2:52 (instrumental; contains a reprise of "Come Live with Me", vocal by Tony Scotti)
12. "Theme from Valley of the Dolls Reprise" – 3:00 (vocal by Dory Previn)
