= The King's Speech (soundtrack) =

The King's Speech (Original Motion Picture Soundtrack)

Film score by Alexandre Desplat
- Released: 22 November 2010
- Studio: Abbey Road Studios (London)
- Genre: Classical
- Length: 41:00
- Label: Decca
- Producer: Alexandre Desplat

Alexandre Desplat chronology
Harry Potter and the Deathly Hallows – Part 1 (2010)	The King's Speech (2010)	The Tree of Life (2011)

The King's Speech (Original Motion Picture Soundtrack) is the soundtrack to the Academy Award-winning film The King's Speech, released by Decca Records on 22 November 2010. Alexandre Desplat composed the film's original music. The score consisted of minimalistic sounds created with piano and strings, and a limited orchestra with oboe and harp being used. It was recorded using old microphones from the EMI archives, used by the royal family, in order to create a vintage and dated sound. The minimalistic use of the music is used to describe Colin Firth's character, the future King George VI.

The score received critical acclaim for Desplat's composition and the use of old microphones for recording the sound of the score. The sound design also received praise from the critics. The score was nominated for several awards, including Best Original Score at the Academy Awards and Golden Globe Awards, losing both awards to Trent Reznor and Atticus Ross' score for The Social Network. However, it won the BAFTA Award for Best Original Music and the Grammy Award for Best Score Soundtrack for Visual Media.

== Development ==
The score was recorded at the Abbey Road Studios in London, with Terry Davies conducting the London Symphony Orchestra. To create a dated sound, the score was recorded on old microphones extracted from the EMI archives which had been specially made for the royal family, suggested by the mastering engineer Peter Cobbin. Desplat said that "Recording both the score and the classical pieces with the orchestra through these microphones made it a special blend, a special color, and I think all this together, the choice of the instrumentation and the choice of the recording through these microphones made it a unique sound and a unique piece like if it was one only composer all together."

The music played during the broadcast of the 1939 radio speech at the climax of the film is from the 2nd movement (Allegretto) of Beethoven's 7th Symphony; it was added by Tariq Anwar, the editor. When Desplat later joined the team to write the music, he praised and defended Anwar's suggestion. Hooper further remarked that the stature of the piece helps elevate the status of the speech to a public event. Desplat also praised Hooper's decision to use Beethoven music in the score, that was initially used as a temp track, but became an integral part in the score. He said "It worked marvellously, and it made sense since it has such a universal quality to it. I would never have been able to compete with that."

== Track listing ==
The album's original release only featured 14 tracks. Another score album, featuring 18 tracks, that are used from the production of the original score, released as a part of "For Your Consideration" for the awards season. More cues were released as a "complete score", but was only limited for digital download.

All tracks are written by Alexandre Desplat, except where noted.

The King's Speech (Original Motion Picture Soundtrack)
No.	Title	Length
1.	"Lionel and Bertie"	2:10
2.	"The King's Speech"	3:54
3.	"My Kingdom, My Rules"	2:51
4.	"The King Is Dead"	2:06
5.	"Memories of Childhood"	3:36
6.	"King George VI"	3:05
7.	"The Royal Household"	1:43
8.	"Queen Elizabeth"	3:35
9.	"Fear and Suspicion"	3:24
10.	"The Rehearsal"	1:42
11.	"The Threat of War"	3:56
12.	"Speaking Unto Nations" (Beethoven: Symphony No. 7, 2nd movement)	5:02
13.	"Epilogue" (Beethoven: Piano Concerto No. 5 "Emperor", 2nd movement)	3:56
14.	"The Logue Method" (Mozart: The Marriage of Figaro overture / Clarinet Concerto 1st movement)	3:45

The King's Speech (For Your Consideration)
No.	Title	Length
1.	"Opening Title (Part 1)"
2.	"Opening Title (Part 2)"
3.	"Opening Title (Part 3)"
4.	"Fog To Logue's"
5.	"Logue's House"
6.	"Listening To Record"
7.	"King George Dies"
8.	"Childhood"
9.	"Marshmallows"
10.	"Sessions Are Over"
11.	"George VI"
12.	"King No Speaks"
13.	"Bertie Cries"
14.	"Don't Be Afraid"
15.	"Bertie's Suspicion"
16.	"The Rehearsal"
17.	"Premises Of War"
18.	"Lionel & Bertie"

The King's Speech (Complete Score)
No.	Title	Length
1.	"Bertie Cries"
2.	"Bertie's Suspicion"
3.	"Childhood"
4.	"Childhood (Alternate)"
5.	"Don't Be Afraid"
6.	"Don't Be Afraid (Alternate)"
7.	"Epilogue (Source)"
8.	"Fog To Logue's"
9.	"George VI"
10.	"King George Dies"
11.	"King George Dies (Alternate)"
12.	"King No Speaks"
13.	"Lionel & Bertie"
14.	"Listening To Record"
15.	"Logue's House"
16.	"Logue's House (Alternate)"
17.	"Marshmallows"
18.	"My Kingdom, My Rules"
19.	"Opening Title (Part 1)"
20.	"Opening Title (Part 2)"
21.	"Opening Title (Part 3)"
22.	"Premises Of War"
23.	"Queen Elizabeth"
24.	"Sessions Are Over"
25.	"Speaking Unto Nations (Long)"
26.	"Speaking Unto Nations (Source)"
27.	"The King's Speech"
28.	"The Rehearsal"

== Reception ==
Desplat's score received critical acclaim. Jonathan Broxton called it as Desplat's second best score of 2010, behind Harry Potter and the Deathly Hallows – Part 1, but called it as "an enjoyable little work which compares favorably with earlier scores". Mfiles.com wrote "The music is appropriately dignified when required, but it is far from aloof. Desplat uses a light touch which brings a warmth to the events and helps the audience identify with the characters." The Joy of Movies wrote "this is a gentle and beautiful score to put on in the background. I think if you enjoy a classical sound, you will like this one."

William Ruhrlmann of AllMusic wrote "Composer Alexandre Desplat provides discreet, restrained music to accompany The King's Speech, the drama about the struggle of Britain's King George VI to overcome his stuttering and speak to his people in times of war and peace. Desplat's piano figures tend to be at the fore, tinkling lightly, supported by the London Symphony Orchestra set to a low heat. By the end, Desplat gives way to Beethoven, whose Symphony No. 7 excerpt and "Emperor" piano concerto fit right in." Sibylla Robertson of Limelight Magazine said "With a simple piano melody and just a whisp of strings, Desplat manages to convey the restrained angst and regal grandeur of the film's hero. This ability to convey character musically is Desplat's great strength."

James Southall wrote "Few, if any, modern film composers are able to bring such a light touch to such a serious film and make it work so well; fewer still are able to write music of such genuine warmth without succumbing to even the tiniest whiff of schmaltz." Filmtracks.com wrote "The King's Speech is an effortless listening experience that, due to the chamber-like ensemble size and/or the obscured recording, will not stir trouble for a moment during its half hour on album (which is rounded off by nine minutes of two Beethoven pieces used for pivotal scenes). Unfortunately, it only inspires in small, conservative doses as well, making it a safe but somewhat unremarkable recommendation." It has been named as one of the composer's best scores from the 2000s' by MovieWeb.

== Accolades ==
Award	Date of ceremony	Category	Recipient(s)	Result	Ref.
Academy Awards	27 February 2011	Best Original Score	Alexandre Desplat	Nominated	
Academy Awards	27 February 2011	Best Sound Mixing	Paul Hamblin, Martin Jensen, John Midgley	Nominated	
British Academy of Film and Television Arts	13 February 2011	Best Film Music	Alexandre Desplat	Won	
British Academy of Film and Television Arts	13 February 2011	Best Sound	John Midgley, Lee Walpole, Paul Hamblin, Martin Jensen	Nominated	
Critics' Choice Movie Awards	14 January 2011	Best Score	Alexandre Desplat	Nominated	
European Film Awards	3 December 2011	Best Composer	Alexandre Desplat	Nominated	
Grammy Awards	12 February 2012	Best Score Soundtrack for Visual Media	The King's Speech	Won	
Golden Globe Awards	16 January 2011	Best Original Score	Alexandre Desplat	Nominated	
International Film Music Critics Association	24 February 2011	Film Score of the Year	Alexandre Desplat	Nominated	
International Film Music Critics Association	24 February 2011	Best Score for a Drama Film	Alexandre Desplat	Won	
Italian Online Movie Awards	8 May 2011	Best Score	Alexandre Desplat	Nominated	

== Chart performance ==
Chart (2010)	Peak position
UK Soundtrack Albums (OCC)	2
US Soundtrack Albums (Billboard)	5
