= Deathly Hallows (disambiguation) =

Deathly Hallows or Harry Potter and the Deathly Hallows is a novel by J. K. Rowling.

Deathly Hallows may also refer to:

- Harry Potter and the Deathly Hallows – Part 1, a 2010 film
  - Harry Potter and the Deathly Hallows – Part 1 (soundtrack), the soundtrack to the film
  - Harry Potter and the Deathly Hallows – Part 1 (video game), a game based on the film
- Harry Potter and the Deathly Hallows – Part 2, a 2011 film
  - Harry Potter and the Deathly Hallows – Part 2 (soundtrack), the soundtrack to the film
  - Harry Potter and the Deathly Hallows – Part 2 (video game), a game based on the film
- Deathly Hallows (objects), fictional magical objects in the novel

== See also ==
- Hallow, to make holy or sacred, to sanctify or consecrate, to venerate
