= Harry Potter and the Deathly Hallows – Part 2 (soundtrack) =

Harry Potter and the Deathly Hallows - Part 2 (Original Motion Picture Soundtrack)

Film score by Alexandre Desplat
- Released: 12 July 2011
- Recorded: 2011
- Studio: Abbey Road Studios (London)
- Genre: Film score
- Length: 68:26
- Label: WaterTower Music
- Producers: Alexandre Desplat; Conrad Pope; Peter Cobbin; Gerard McCann

Harry Potter and the Deathly Hallows - Part 2 (Original Motion Picture Soundtrack) is a motion picture soundtrack to the 2011 film of the same name composed and conducted by Alexandre Desplat. The soundtrack was nominated for a Grammy Award, Satellite Award, Houston Film Critics Society Award, Denver Film Critics Society Award, and an IFMCA Award for Best Original Score for a Fantasy Film. The soundtrack won the San Diego Film Critics Society Award for Best Score.

== Development ==
It was confirmed on the Warner Bros. website that Part 1 composer Alexandre Desplat would return to score Part 2. In an interview with Film Music Magazine, Desplat stated that scoring Part 2 is "a great challenge" and that he has "a lot of expectations to fulfil and a great deal of work" ahead of him. Desplat started writing the music in early 2011 and finished recording with orchestrators Conrad Pope, Jean-Pascal Beintus, Bill Newlin, Nan Schwartz, Clifford Tasner, Alejandro de la Llosa and a 105-piece ensemble of the London Symphony Orchestra on 27 May 2011 at Abbey Road Studios, as stated on Pope's official Facebook page. Actress Evanna Lynch confessed in 2011's LeakyCon that she was invited to the scoring sessions, when Desplat was recording the music for the Gringotts sequence.

The main theme of the film, "Lily's Theme", was performed by Mai Fujisawa, daughter of Japanese composer Joe Hisaishi. In the film, several tracks are re-used from previous Harry Potter films, which are not included in the released soundtrack: a variant of "Hedwig's Theme", originally composed by John Williams, which plays during a scene in Harry Potter and the Chamber of Secrets, is used twice in Part 2. The first time it plays is when Harry, Ron, and Hermione meet with their friends in the Room of Requirement. Critics have claimed that this added strongly to the deep, moving feelings made and the sense of hope given to the audience. The second time is when Snape is sent out of the castle, and the Order of the Phoenix takes over control of Hogwarts. "Dumbledore's Farewell", composed by Nicholas Hooper for Harry Potter and the Half-Blood Prince, is used by Desplat in the track "Severus and Lily", which plays during the "Prince's Tale" sequence. A variant of Hooper's "The Kiss" from Harry Potter and the Order of the Phoenix also makes an appearance throughout the Hogwarts viaduct scene. The final scene of Part 2, set 19 years after the Battle of Hogwarts includes "Leaving Hogwarts", composed by Williams for the first film, followed by a suite of "Hedwig's Theme" for the end credits.

Desplat spoke of the use of Williams' themes in Part 2, saying, "Well, we all know there's one theme, which has become iconic, Hedwig's Theme from John Williams. This theme is crucial to the success of the story, and it would have been disrespectful and stupid for me not to use it at the crucial moments where we need to refer to these ten years of friendships that we've all had with these characters and kids, so Hedwig's Theme does reoccur a lot more [than] in Part 1 where loss of innocence was the main theme of the film [...]"

== Critical reception ==
Professional ratings
Review scores
Source	Rating
AllMusic	3/5 stars
Empire	5/5 stars
Evening Hour	5/5 stars
Filmtracks	5/5 stars
Movie Music UK	5/5 stars
Soundtrack Geek	5/5 stars
Movie Wave	5/5 stars

The soundtrack received critical acclaim. Jorn Tillnes of Soundtrack Geek gave the soundtrack a 9/10 and noted, "Part 2 ends in anything but tears. It is a joy to listen to just like Part 1 and using the Hedwig's Theme by John Williams, which is the ultimate Harry Potter theme after all, is a brilliant touch." Christian Clemmensen of Filmtracks gave the soundtrack an overall rating of 4/5, the music as heard on the album 3/5, and rated the score in the context of the film a 5/5, and commented, "Desplat finally proves that his style can transcend his obvious technical mastery of an orchestra and reach levels of tonal majesty that can be summed up in a single word: epic."

Danny Graydon from Empire Online gave the soundtrack a 5/5 rating, and said "Just as John Williams created Harry Potter's musical language, Alexandre Desplat succeeds magnificently in completing it. Desplat crafts a highly emotional thematic anchor with its strings and solo vocalist." Another review came from Allmusic.com; James Christopher Monger gave the soundtrack a 3/5 and commented, "Bombastic, sinister, and triumphant, the appropriately dark and apocalyptic Deathly Hallows, Pt. 2 may sit near the bottom of the Potter soundtrack pile, but it can hardly be called a failure." Later, a review came from Jonathan Broxton of Movie Music UK, who rated the score 5/5 stars, and commented, "I can't speak highly enough of Desplat's achievement in concluding the Harry Potter franchise the way he has..., Harry's story was always about death, and Desplat's decision to build his score around a musical motif representing those departed souls was a perfect one. This is one of the scores of the year." Evening Hour rated the soundtrack 4.5/5, commenting, "Desplat has proved to be a formidable force in the success of the Deathly Hallows films, seamlessly blending emotional nuance with action-packed grandeur. He has, in short, created a satisfying and richly layered aural landscape that I will always love coming back to."

== Release ==
The soundtrack was released on 12 July 2011. Previews of the tracks were released on 23 June 2011.

== Track listing ==
All tracks are composed, produced and conducted by Alexandre Desplat.

Harry Potter and the Deathly Hallows - Part 2 (Original Motion Picture Soundtrack) track listing
No.	Title	Music	Length
1.	"Lily's Theme"		2:28
2.	"The Tunnel"		1:09
3.	"Underworld"		5:24
4.	"Gringotts"		2:24
5.	"Dragon Flight"	Includes Hedwig's Theme by John Williams	1:43
6.	"Neville"		1:40
7.	"A New Headmaster"	Includes Hedwig's Theme	3:25
8.	"Panic Inside Hogwarts"		1:53
9.	"Statues"		2:22
10.	"The Grey Lady"		5:51
11.	"In the Chamber of Secrets"	Includes Hedwig's Theme	1:37
12.	"Battlefield"		2:13
13.	"The Diadem"	Includes Hedwig's Theme	3:08
14.	"Broomsticks and Fire"		1:24
15.	"Courtyard Apocalypse"		2:00
16.	"Snape's Demise"	Includes Hedwig's Theme	2:51
17.	"Severus and Lily"	Includes Dumbledore's Farewell by Nicholas Hooper	6:08
18.	"Harry's Sacrifice"	Includes Hedwig's Theme	1:57
19.	"The Resurrection Stone"		4:32
20.	"Harry Surrenders"		1:30
21.	"Procession"	Includes Hedwig's Theme	2:07
22.	"Neville the Hero"		2:17
23.	"Showdown"	Includes Hedwig's Theme	3:37
24.	"Voldemort's End"		2:44
25.	"A New Beginning"	Includes The Kiss by Nicholas Hooper	1:39
Total length:			68:26

== Credits and personnel ==
Personnel adapted from the album liner notes.

- Piers Adams – recorder
- John Barrett – assistant engineer
- David Barron – executive producer
- Jean-Pascal Beintus – orchestration
- Clive Bell – shakuhachi
- Paul Broucek – executive in charge of music
- Peter Clarke – music editor
- Paul Clarvis – ethnic percussion
- Peter Cobbin – mixing, producer, recording
- Charles Cole – choir master
- Alexandre Desplat – composer, conductor, flute, liner notes, orchestration, percussion, piano, producer
- Ninon Desplat – score coordinator
- Terry Edwards – choir master
- Xavier Forcioli – score coordinator
- Rebecca Gilliver – cello
- Mark Graham – music preparation
- David Heyman – executive producer
- Robert Houston – score editor
- Allan Jenkins – music editor
- Lewis Jones – Pro-Tools
- Jill Kemp – recorder
- Gabriella Kitto – soprano (vocal)
- Annabel Knight – recorder
- Carmine Lauri – concert master
- Jakob Lindberg – theorbo
- Jason Linn – executive in charge of music
- London Oratory – junior choir, chorus
- London Symphony Orchestra – orchestra
- London Voices – choir, chorus
- Mai Fujisawa - solo vocalist
- Sue Mallet – music contractor
- Lisa Margolis – music business affairs
- Gerard McCann – producer, supervising music editor
- Eoghan McNelis – soprano (vocal)
- David Miller – lute, theorbo
- Stuart Morton – music editor
- John Parricelli – guitar
- Patrick Phillips – assistant engineer
- Conrad Pope – producer, supervising orchestrator
- Paul Pritchard – assistant engineer
- Katie Reynolds – post production supervisor
- Sam Okell – mixing, recording
- Schola Cantorum of the Cardinal Vaughan Memorial School – choir, chorus
- Nan Schwartz – orchestration
- Sandeep Sriram – art direction
- Alison Stephens – mandolin
- Marc Stevens – music contractor
- Clifford Jay Tasner – orchestration
- Katie Trethewey – soprano (vocal)
- David Walter – MIDI programming
- Kirsty Whalley – score editor
- Subodh Chikhalkar – score editor
- Gaurav Nagarkatti – assistant score editor (assistant to Subodh Chikhalkar)
- John Williams – original composer of "Hedwig's Theme" and additional themes, including the unreleased cue "Epilogue (19 Years Later)", originally "Leaving Hogwarts" from Harry Potter and the Philosopher's Stone.
- Nicholas Hooper - original composer of the cue "Dumbledore's Farewell" from Harry Potter and the Half-Blood Prince
- David Yates – executive producer, liner notes

== Charts ==
Chart (2011)	Peak position
Austrian Albums Chart	51
Mexican Albums Chart	64
Swiss Music Charts	58
US Billboard 200	25
US Top Independent Albums	4
US Top Soundtracks	2
US Digital Albums	10

2025 weekly chart performance for Harry Potter And The Deathly Hallows Part II
Chart (2025)	Peak position
Hungarian Physical Albums (MAHASZ)	39
