= Land of the Lost (soundtrack) =

Land of the Lost (Original Motion Picture Soundtrack)

Film score by Michael Giacchino
- Released: June 9, 2009
- Recorded: 2009
- Studios: Eastwood Scoring Stage, Warner Bros. Studios, Burbank, California; Newman Scoring Stage, 20th Century Fox Studios, Los Angeles
- Genre: Film score
- Length: 60:37
- Label: Varèse Sarabande
- Producer: Michael Giacchino

Michael Giacchino chronology
Up (2009)	Land of the Lost (2009)	Earth Days (2009)

Land of the Lost (Original Motion Picture Soundtrack) is the film score, composed by Michael Giacchino, to the 2009 film Land of the Lost, directed by Brad Silberling, which was loosely based on Sid and Marty Krofft's television series of the same name. The film stars Will Ferrell, Danny McBride, Anna Friel, and Jorma Taccone. The film's original score is composed by Giacchino, conducted by Tim Simonec, performed by the Hollywood Studio Symphony, and the 32-track score album was released through Varèse Sarabande on June 9, 2009.

== Development ==
Michael Giacchino composed the film score. He accepted the offer after liking the works of Sid and Marty Krofft, including the original 1974 television series, which he watched during his childhood. He collaborated with the Krofft brothers, who provided their comments and suggestions and also helped in the production and shared both personal and professional ideas. For this film, Giacchino worked on unusual percussions and instrumentations. He visited the warehouse of veteran percussionist Emil Richards in Los Angeles, where he bought an assortment of percussions and also few conch shells from French horn player Rick Todd, who played the instrument along with five other French horn players.

He considered it fun to reach the experimental music style from the 1970s, that Jerry Goldsmith did it with perfection. When Giacchino discussed it with Silberling regarding the same, he thought of taking this style much serious, something that suited for Abbott and Costello Meet Frankenstein (1948) while having a detachment for funny music. Hence, the music played on much serious note over a comical note. Guitarist George Doering played the guitar in an unusual way, that sounded like theremin, as per Giacchino's suggestions. He also used banjo as well, as the original theme also featured that instrument. Giacchino used an old synthesizer with a particular patch that sounded like a musical time machine, and that sound felt nostalgic taking back to the times, when he watched the original show. He considered it a fun score to write as he could balance the nonsensical nature with the serious elements. Giacchino also incorporated the original themes composed by Jimmie Haskell for the television show as well.

Giacchino wrote around 75 minutes of music, while only 60 minutes are on the soundtrack. He recorded the score at the Warner Bros. Eastwood Scoring Stage collaborating with an 88-piece orchestra and a 35-person choir from Hollywood Studio Symphony. On May 10, 2009, Dave Mustaine, a member of the thrash metal band Megadeth stated that some music from the band would be featured in the film, though it was not clear that whether the band would write new music specifically for the film or existing tracks of them would appear. It was later noted that parts of the song "The Right to Go Insane", from the 2009 album Endgame, can be heard near the end of the film.

== Track listing ==
No.	Title	Length
1.	"Swamp and Circumstance"	01:21
2.	"The Ligher Side of Archaeology"	01:02
3.	"Food Coma for Thought"	01:00
4.	"A Routine Expedition"	00:49
5.	"The Greatest Earthquake Ever Known"	03:11
6.	"Matt Lauer Can Suck It"	01:22
7.	"Chaka Chasedown"	00:43
8.	"The One That Got Away"	04:16
9.	"Enik Calls For Marshall"	01:15
10.	"Sleestak Attack"	02:01
11.	"Enik the Altrusian"	03:19
12.	"The Cosmin Land and Found"	01:35
13.	"When Piss on Your Head is a Bad Idea"	03:52
14.	"A New Marshall in Town"	01:36
15.	"Pterodactyl Ptemper Ptantrum"	00:43
16.	"The Crystal Cave"	01:42
17.	"In Search of ... Holly"	01:34
18.	"Undercover Sleestak"	02:17
19.	"Never Trust a Dude in a Tunic"	04:18
20.	"If You don't Make It, It's Your Own Damn Vault"	02:37
21.	"Holly Mad As Sin"	00:51
22.	"Sleestak Showdown"	00:53
23.	"Stakbusters"	02:33
24.	"Fight Fight Fight"	01:26
25.	"Crystal Clear"	02:32
26.	"Mystery Cave Reunion"	01:21
27.	"Ready and Will"	01:36
28.	"End Credits Can Suck it!"	03:26
29.	"Pop Goes the Sleestak"	00:16
30.	"A Routine Expedition" (film version)	00:49
31.	"The Devil's Canyon Mystery Cave"	02:03
32.	"Crystal Clear" (film version)	02:18
Total length:		60:37

== Critical reception ==
Christian Clemmensen of Filmtracks considered the music to be "extremely taxing in parts and dull in others, compounded by the dry recording mix" calling Giacchino's work being a "disappointment that was sadly predictable in retrospect." Jason Thurston of AllMusic wrote "Giacchino brings the majesty on an album possibly more invigorating than the film itself." Michael Quinn of BBC admitted that "Giacchino has fashioned a surprisingly intricate and detailed score with sufficient passages of romance and drama to catch the imagination and enough moments of orchestral repose to catch your breath."

Jonathan Broxton of Movie Music UK admitted that the action music inspired by the 1960s works, and "the ensemble performing the score would in other circumstances have made for interesting listening"; however, the "scattershot attitude and somewhat muddled structure" led him to feel unengaged, though the score was partly enjoyable. Thomas Glorieux of Maintitles considered the score to be perfect for Jerry Goldsmith owing to how he handled madcap adventures, and though Giacchino had implemented the same, the score was "too madcap even for its listening experience". He further added that Goldsmith provided a cohesive experience on tying the loose ends which Giacchino had not perfected, leaving the score to be "too chaotic to get a kick out of it."

Brent Simon of Screen International wrote "Michael Giacchino provides a delightfully engaging score". Negatively, Variety's Brian Lowry wrote "Other wasted contributions amid a soundtrack replete with loud screaming include Michael Giacchino's score." Chris Bumbray of JoBlo.com wrote "the only praise-worthy thing[s] about this film, is the above average musical score by Michael Giacchino (which nicely evokes the old Saturday morning Sid & Marty Kroft show this is based on)". Nick Rogers of Midwest Film Journal wrote "Michael Giacchino's fine score also is far more inspired than the film it accompanies."

== Accolades ==
Award	Date of ceremony	Category	Recipients	Result	Ref.
World Soundtrack Awards	October 17, 2009	Soundtrack Composer of the Year	Michael Giacchino (Note: also for Star Trek and Up (both 2009))	Nominated	

== Personnel ==
Credits adapted from liner notes:

- Music composer and producer – Michael Giacchino
- Recordist – Greg Dennen, Tim Lauber
- Recording – Dan Wallin, Tim Simonec
- Mixing – Dan Wallin
- Mastering – Erick Labson
- Music editor – Alex Levy, Joe. E Rand, Stephen M. Davis
- Assistant music editor – Alexandra Apostolakis
- Music preparation – Booker White
- Scoring crew – Denis St. Amand, Jamie Olvera, Jay Selvester, Richard Wheeler, Ryan Robinson, Stacey Robinson, Tom Steel
- Executive producer – Robert Townson
- Album direction for Universal Pictures – David Buntz
- Director of scoring for Universal Pictures – Tiffany Jones
- Music business affairs for Universal Pictures – Phil Cohen
- Executive in charge of music for Universal Pictures – Harry Garfield, Kathy Nelson

Orchestra

- Performer – The Hollywood Studio Symphony
- Orchestration – Andrea Datzman, Brad Dechter, Cameron Patrick, Chad Seiter, Jack J. Hayes, Larry Kenton, Mark Gasbarro, Michael Giacchino, Peter Boyer, Tim Simonec
- Orchestra conductor – Tim Simonec
- Orchestra contractor – Reggie Wilson
- Concertmaster – Clayton Haslop

Musicians

- Bassoon – Andrew Radford, Peter Mandell
- Cello – Armen Ksajikian, Daniel Smith, David Speltz, Kevan Torfeh, Matthew Cooker, Richard Naill, Rudolph Stein, Stefanie Fife, Steven Richards, Suzie Katayama, Timothy Landauer, Vahe Hayrikyan, Victor Lawrence
- Clarinet – Donald Markese, John J. Mitchell, Michael Vaccaro
- Electric bass – Abraham Laboriel
- Flute – Richard Mitchell, Phillip Feather, Robert Shulgold, Stephen Kujala
- French horn – Brian O'Connor, Diane Muller, Joseph Meyer, John Reynolds, Kurt Snyder, Richard Todd, Steven Becknell, Steven Durnin
- Guitar – Carl Verheyen, George Doering
- Harp – Gayle Levant
- Oboe – Christopher Bleth, John Yoakum, Joseph Stone
- Percussion – Alex Neciosup-Acuña, Bernard Dresel, Daniel Greco, Emil Radocchia, Michael Englander, Ralph Humphrey, Walter Rodriguez
- Piano – Mark Gasbarro
- String bass – Charles Nenneker, David Stone, Edward Meares, Karl Vincent, Nico Abondolo, Norman Ludwin, Peter Doubrovsky
- Timpani – Donald Williams
- Trombone – Alan Kaplan, Alexander Iles, William Reichenbach, Charles Loper, Steven Holtman
- Trumpet – Jeff Bunnell, Jon Lewis, Paul Salvo, Rick Baptist
- Tuba – John Van Houten Jr
- Viola – Alan Busteed, Caroline Buckman, Darrin McCann, David Stenske, Denyse Buffum, Harry Shirinian, Jorge Moraga, Karie Prescott, Marda Todd, Matthew Funes, Michael Nowak, Pamela Goldsmith, Richard Rintoul
- Violin – Alexander Shlifer, Alyssa Park, Armen Garabedian, Barbra Porter, Belinda Broughton, Charles Everett, Charles Bisharat, Galina Golovin, Gina Kronstadt, Harris Goldman, James Sitterly, Joel Derouin, John Wittenberg, Laurence Greenfield, Miran Kojian, Norman Hughes, Peter Kent, Rafael Rishik, Razdan Kuyumjian, Rebecca Bunnell, Robert Matsuda, Ron Clark, Shalini Vijayan, Shari Zippert, Vladimir Polimatidi, Kenneth Yerke, Clayton Haslop

Choir

- Vocal contractor – Bobbi Page
- Vocals – Page LA Studio Voices
- Alto vocals – Alice Kirwan Murray, Amy Fogerson, Andrea Datzman, Andrea Miller, Bobette Jamison-Harrison, Bobbi Page, Calabria Foti, Carmen Twillie, Cindy Bourquin, Debbie Hall Gleason, Karen Harper, Kathryn Reed, Luana Jackman, Monica Lee, Susan Boyd Joyce, Walt Harrah
- Baritone vocals – Ed Zajac, Greg Jasperse, Guy Maeda, Larry Kenton, Michael Mishaw, Rick Logan, Roger Freeland, Scott Dicken, Tonoccus McClain
- Bass vocals – Eric Bradley, Gregg Geiger, Josef Powell, Marc Antonio Pritchett, Michael Geiger, Reid Bruton, Royce Reynolds, Vatsche Barsoumian
- Solo vocals – Andrea Datzman
- Vocal contractor – Bobbi Page
