= Ratatouille (disambiguation) =

Ratatouille is a French vegetable dish.

Ratatouille may also refer to:

- Ratatouille (film), a 2007 animated film by Pixar about a rat aspiring to be a chef

- Ratatouille (video game), multiplatform video game tie-in to the film
- Ratatouille: Food Frenzy, Nintendo DS video game tie-in to the film
- Ratatouille (soundtrack), soundtrack of the same name of the film composed by Michael Giacchino
- Ratatouille: L'Aventure Totalement Toquée de Rémy, a park ride at Walt Disney Studios Park and Epcot
- Ratatouille the Musical, a crowdsourced 2020 musical
