= Up (soundtrack) =

Up (Original Motion Picture Soundtrack)
- 2009 digital cover

Film score by Michael Giacchino
- Released: May 26, 2009 (original release); June 28, 2011 (re-release)
- Recorded: 2008–2009
- Length: 53:12
- Labels: Walt Disney; Intrada
- Producer: Michael Giacchino

Michael Giacchino chronology
| Star Trek (2009) | Up (2009) | Land of the Lost (2009) |

Alternative cover
- 2011 Intrada cover

Up (Original Motion Picture Soundtrack) is the film score to the 2009 Disney-Pixar film of the same name composed and arranged by Michael Giacchino. This is his third feature film for Pixar after The Incredibles and Ratatouille. Giacchino wrote a character theme-based score that the filmmakers felt enhanced the story of the film. Up received positive reviews from music critics and won major awards. Despite being well regarded, Up was not released as a compact disc (CD) until 2011, when it became available via Intrada Records.

The score album was nominated to multiple awards. It earned two Grammy Awards: Best Score Soundtrack Album for a Motion Picture, Television or Other Visual Media and Best Instrumental Composition for "Married Life", at the 2010 ceremony. The score also won the Golden Globe Award for Best Original Score at 67th Golden Globe Awards, the Academy Award for Best Original Score at the 82nd Academy Awards, and the BAFTA Award for Best Film Music. Up was the first Disney film since Pocahontas to win the Academy Award for Best Original Score, spanning a gap of 14 years, and the first Pixar film to win the award. It also became one of few scores to win an Oscar, a Golden Globe, a BAFTA, and a Grammy.

== Composition ==
The type of compositional technique used on the score is called thematic transformation, a technique commonly used in large-scaled classical music compositions, in which more than one theme is involved and related together in a single piece of music.

== Critical reception ==
Professional ratings
Review scores
| Source | Rating |
|---|---|
| About.com | 3.5/5 stars |
| Empire | 4/5 stars |
| Filmtracks | 4/5 stars |
| Soundtrack Geek | 10/10 |
| Tracksounds! | 8/10 |

The score received positive reviews from music critics. "Throughout the soundtrack, Giacchino keeps things fresh with his engaging melodies and variations, and Up succeeds as an old-fashioned score that doesn't shy away from emotion or catchy tunes.", was the positive review from iTunes. Christopher Coleman, from tracksounds.com, gave the score 8 out of 10 stars, commenting: "The experience of his [Giacchino's] original score went from mediocre to marvelous with a single viewing of the film".

Danny Graydon, Empire writer, declared "Giacchino's primary theme moves from the jaunty jazz flourish of the opening titles" ... "The score's emotional content is further fuelled by two similarly flexible (albeit more subtle) themes". Christian Clemmensen of Filmtracks.com awarded the score a four star rating out of five, but wrote a mixed review: "In general, the vintage jazz and Waltz combination is effective in raising the spirit of adventure specifically from the perspective of an elderly man, but this material could potentially sound geriatric to some listeners seeking only loftier fantasy elements". Regarding Disney's initial decision to not release the score on compact disc, Clemmensen went on to say "Unfortunately, with a score as dynamic in instrumental range as Up, hearing it in compressed MP3 form is simply unacceptable. This format may work for headphones, but the recording sounds dull and flat on any sizable stereo system."

== Track listing ==
All music is composed by Michael Giacchino, with the exception of the last three, which are sound effects by Skywalker Sound.

Up (Original Motion Picture Soundtrack) track listing
| No. | Title | Length |
|---|---|---|
| 1. | "Up with Titles" | 0:53 |
| 2. | "We're in the Club Now" | 0:43 |
| 3. | "Married Life" | 4:10 |
| 4. | "Carl Goes Up" | 3:33 |
| 5. | "52 Chachki Pickup" | 1:14 |
| 6. | "Paradise Found" | 1:03 |
| 7. | "Walkin' the House" | 1:03 |
| 8. | "Three Dog Dash" | 0:51 |
| 9. | "Kevin Beak'n" | 1:14 |
| 10. | "Canine Conundrum" | 2:03 |
| 11. | "The Nickel Tour" | 0:52 |
| 12. | "The Explorer Motel" | 1:26 |
| 13. | "Escape from Muntz Mountain" | 2:43 |
| 14. | "Giving Muntz the Bird" | 1:58 |
| 15. | "Stuff We Did" | 2:13 |
| 16. | "Memories Can Weigh You Down" | 1:12 |
| 17. | "The Small Mailman Returns" | 3:11 |
| 18. | "He's Got the Bird" | 0:29 |
| 19. | "Seizing the Spirit of Adventure" | 5:19 |
| 20. | "It's Just a House" | 1:59 |
| 21. | "The Ellie Badge" | 1:30 |
| 22. | "Up with End Credits" | 7:38 |
| 23. | "The Spirit of Adventure" | 2:23 |
| 24. | "Carl's Maiden Voyage" | 0:52 |
| 25. | "Muntz's Dark Reverie" | 0:52 |
| 26. | "Meet Kevin in the Jungle" | 1:32 |
| Total length: | | 53:12 |

== Personnel ==
Credits from Up notes:

- Michael Giacchino – composer and additional orchestrations
- Tim Simonec – orchestration and conductor
- Dan Wallin – sound recorder and mixer
- Peter Boyer – additional orchestrations
- Jack J. Hayes – additional orchestrations
- Larry Kenton – additional orchestrations
- Jennifer Hammond – additional orchestrations
- Hollywood Studio Symphony – performance
- Stephen Davis – music editor
- Mark Willsher – music editor
- Reggie Wilson – orchestra contractor
- Andrea Datzman – score coordinator
- Luis M. Rojas – cover art design

== Charts ==
| Chart (2009) | Peak position |
|---|---|
| US Billboard Soundtracks | 15 |

== Release history ==
| Date | Format | Label | Edition |
|---|---|---|---|
| May 26, 2009 | Digital Download | Walt Disney Records | Standard |
| June 28, 2011 | CD | Walt Disney/Intrada Records | Limited (10,000 copies) |

== Accolades ==
| Result | Award | Ceremony | Recipients and nominees |
|---|---|---|---|
| Won | Academy Award for Best Original Score | 82nd Academy Awards | Michael Giacchino |
| Nominated | Annie Award for Music in an Animated Feature Production | 37th Annie Awards | Michael Giacchino |
| Won | Austin Film Critics Award for Best Score | 5th Austin Film Critics Association Awards | Michael Giacchino |
| Won | Anthony Asquith Award for Film Music | 63rd British Academy Film Awards | Michael Giacchino |
| Won | Broadcast Film Critics Association Award for Best Score | 14th Critic's Choice Awards | Michael Giacchino |
| Won | Chicago Film Critics Association Award for Best Original Score | 21st Chicago Film Critics Association Awards | Michael Giacchino |
| Won | Golden Globe Award for Best Original Score | 67th Golden Globe Awards | Michael Giacchino |
| Won | Grammy Award for Best Score Soundtrack Album for a Motion Picture, Television or Other Visual Media | 52nd Grammy Awards | Michael Giacchino |
| Won | Grammy Award for Best Instrumental Composition — "Married Life" | 52nd Grammy Awards | Michael Giacchino |
| Nominated | Grammy Award for Best Instrumental Arrangement — "Up with End Credits" | 52nd Grammy Awards | Michael Giacchino, Tim Simonec |
| Won | Online Film Critics Society Award for Best Original Score | 13th Online Film Critics Society Awards | Michael Giacchino |
| Won | Phoenix Film Critics Society Award for Best Original Score | 10th Phoenix Film Critics Society Awards | Michael Giacchino |
| Nominated | Satellite Award for Best Original Score | 14th Satellite Awards | Michael Giacchino |
| Nominated | Saturn Award for Best Music | 36th Saturn Awards | Michael Giacchino |
