= Two: Glass Apple =

Studio album by Melodramus
- Released: October 26, 2010
- Genre: Progressive metal, rock, gothic
- Length: 56:29
- Label: Sumthing Else Music Works, Song Haus Music
- Producer: Matt Winegar

Melodramus chronology
30 Silver Pieces (2007)	Two: Glass Apple (2010)	1+1=1 (2019)

Two: Glass Apple is the second studio album by Salt Lake City, Utah-based band Melodramus, it was produced by Matt Winegar (Primus, Coheed and Cambria, Royal Bliss). The song "Black and Grey" is on the new Speed Racer soundtrack released by Sumthing Else Music Works. "Searching," and "Suffer Like You" are the first music videos from the album. Ted Newsom left the band shortly after the album was released.

== Track listing ==
No.	Title	Length
1.	"Down in Flames"	3:30
2.	"Vapors"	4:06
3.	"Frozen"	3:24
4.	"Black and Gray"	4:21
5.	"Searching"	6:07
6.	"Generation Same"	7:40
7.	"Two"	7:01
8.	"Glass Apple"	5:18
9.	"VHM"	7:43
10.	"Suffer Like You"	7:21

== Professional reviews ==
- GLORYDAZE Music's review of "Two: Glass Apple"
- SLUG Magazine's review of "Two: Glass Apple"
