= Mission: Impossible III (soundtrack) =

Mission: Impossible III (Music from the Original Motion Picture Soundtrack)

Soundtrack album by Michael Giacchino
- Released: May 9, 2006
- Recorded: March 2006, Sony Scoring Stage, Culver City
- Genre: Soundtrack
- Length: 65:02
- Label: Varèse Sarabande
- Producer: Michael Giacchino

Michael Giacchino chronology
The Family Stone (2005)	Mission: Impossible III (Music from the Original Motion Picture Soundtrack) (2006)	Ratatouille (2007)

Professional ratings
Review scores
Source	Rating
AllMusic	2.5/5 stars
Filmtracks.com	3/5 stars

Mission: Impossible III (Music from the Original Motion Picture Soundtrack) is the soundtrack album for the 2006 film Mission: Impossible III, composed and arranged by Michael Giacchino, conducted by Tim Simonec and performed by the Hollywood Studio Symphony. Unlike the previous two films in the series, there was no album released containing the film's contemporary music.

== Overview ==
After J. J. Abrams signed on to direct Mission: Impossible III, he brought many of his frequent collaborators onto the production, one of which was composer Michael Giacchino, who became attached to write the musical score in early 2005. "[It was] not just me, but [Abrams'] editors, the writers, the production designer," said Giacchino. "It's really a group of friends, which is the greatest thing about working with him. It makes me feel like I'm 10 again, making movies in the backyard with my friends."

The score for Mission: Impossible III was recorded over the course of eight days at the Sony Scoring Stage in Culver City, California. It featured a 112-piece orchestra conducted by Tim Simonec. The scoring session attracted numerous star personalities, including Jennifer Garner and Merrin Dungey (from J. J. Abram's Alias), Sarah Vowell (from The Incredibles), Dermot Mulroney, as well as Tom Cruise, who conducted the orchestra in the "MI Theme".

Rapper Kanye West recorded and release a single for the soundtrack called "Impossible" featuring Twista and Keyshia Cole, which served as the film's theme song in addition to the original Mission: Impossible theme.

== Track listing ==
All music is composed by Michael Giacchino.

No.	Title	Length
1.	"Mission: Impossible Theme"	0:51
2.	"Factory Rescue^{[b]}"	4:14
3.	"Evacuation"	2:46
4.	"Helluvacopter Chase"	3:15
5.	"Special Agent Lindsey Farris"	2:46
6.	"Ethan and Julia"	1:24
7.	"Humpty Dumpty Sat On a Wall^{[a]}"	5:55
8.	"Masking Agent^{[a]}"	3:41
9.	"Voice Capture"	2:41
10.	"See You In The Sewer^{[a]}"	1:45
11.	"Davian's Brought In"	2:06
12.	"Bridge Battle"	4:13
13.	"Davian Gets The Girl"	2:44
14.	"IMF Escape"	2:44
15.	"Disguise The Limit"	3:24
16.	"Shang Way High"	3:39
17.	"The Chutist"	1:59
18.	"Hunting For Jules"	3:55
19.	"World's Worst Last 4 Minutes To Live"	4:11
20.	"Reparations"	3:36
21.	"Schifrin and Variations^{[a]}"	3:04

== Personnel ==
Credits adopted from liner notes:

Production

- Michael Giacchino – composer, producer, arranger
- Lalo Schifrin – original material
- J. J. Abrams – executive producer
- Danny Bramson – executive producer, music supervisor
- Robert Townson – executive producer for Varèse Sarabande
- Hollywood Studio Symphony – orchestra
- Reggie Wilson – orchestra contractor
- Matthew Joseph Peak – CD package design

Technical

- Dan Wallin – recording, mixing
- Stephen M. Davis – supervising music editor
- Alex Levy – music editor
- Alan Schlaifer – assistant music editor
- Paul Apelgren – music editor coordinator
- Greg Lookorn – music technical engineer
- Mark Eshelman – music floor person
- Bryan Clements – music floor person
- Erick Labson – mastering

Orchestration

- Tim Simonec – orchestration, conductor
- Peter Boyer – orchestration
- Harvey R. Cohen – orchestration
- Mark Gasbarro – orchestration
- Jack Hayes – orchestration
- Larry Kenton – orchestration
- Chris Tilton – orchestration
- Chad Seiter – score assistant
- Andrea Datzman – score assistant
- Booker T. White – music preparation
- Adam Michalak – music recordist

Acoustic Instruments

- Peter Erskine - drums, percussion
- Abraham Laboriel - electric bass
- Michael Giacchino - grand piano
- Mark Gasbarro- keyboards

== Additional music ==
Additional music featured in Mission: Impossible III:

Title	Musician(s)	Key Scenes/Notes
"Mission: Impossible Theme"	Lalo Schifrin	
"Come Into My Life"	Jimmy Cliff	
"Song 5000"	J. J. Abrams	
"Back Door Santa"	The Black Crowes	
"Best of My Love"	The Emotions	
"A Sunday Kind of Love"	Etta James	
"Tell Me Something Good"	Rufus and Chaka Khan	
"Groksploitation"	Thomas Dolby and J. J. Abrams	
"The Plot"	Lalo Shifrin	
"String Quartet No. 4, Op. 18, No. 4 in C minor"	Ludwig van Beethoven	
"String Quartet in B Major, Op. 1, No. 1 (La Chasse)"	Joseph Haydn	
"We Are Family"	Sister Sledge	
"Impossible"	Kanye West	The song is played during the end credits. It samples New Birth's rendition of "It's Impossible".

== Notes ==
- ^{^a} Contains Mission: Impossible Theme by Lalo Schifrin
- ^{^b} Contains "The Plot" by Lalo Schifrin
