= Impossible (Kanye West song) =

Single by Kanye West featuring Twista, Keyshia Cole and BJ
- B-side: "Impossible" (Instrumental) / "Drive Slow" (Strings Mix)
- Released: May 5, 2006
- Recorded: March 2006, Sony Scoring Stage, Culver City
- Genre: Hip hop
- Length: 3:23
- Label: Roc-A-Fella; Def Jam
- Songwriters: Kanye West; Bryan James Sledge; Carl Terrell Mitchell; Keyshia Cole; Sid Wayne; Armando Manzanero
- Producer: Kanye West

Kanye West singles chronology
| "Touch the Sky" (2006) | "Impossible" (2006) | "Drive Slow" (2006) |

Twista singles chronology
| "Spit Your Game" (2006) | "Impossible" (2006) | "Don't Get It Twisted" (2006) |

"Impossible" is a song by American hip-hop recording artist Kanye West, featuring Twista, Keyshia Cole and BJ. The song was made for the film Mission: Impossible III and was used as its official theme song, but was not featured on its soundtrack album. It appeared on the US Billboard Hot R&B/Hip-Hop Songs and Bubbling Under Hot 100 charts in 2006.

== Background ==
While the rest of the music for the film Mission: Impossible III was recorded over the course of eight days at the Sony Scoring Stage in Culver City, California, "Impossible" was originally an outtake from Twista's fourth album Kamikaze, which West found to be the perfect offering to be used in Mission: Impossible III, when franchise star Tom Cruise asked for a contribution.

Cruise was said to be delighted at West contributing to the soundtrack, describing himself as being "a fan of Kanye's work".

== Composition ==
Vocals from "It's Impossible" by New Birth are sampled throughout the track. West claimed the track took "50 hours" to produce.

== Critical reception ==
"Impossible" was placed on a list of '20 Horrible Songs Made By Great Rappers' that Al Shipley of Complex published in 2013. Jonathan Ringen of Rolling Stone rated the song two out of five stars and elaborated by writing: "It doesn't quite work: The skittering beat never settles into a groove, and the rhymes never explain what, exactly, is supposed to be so impossible."

== Track listing ==
CD single

1. "Impossible" (Radio) – 3:23
2. "Impossible" (Extended Radio) – 5:12
3. "Impossible" (Instrumental) – 5:09

12" single

A-side

1. "Impossible" (Radio) - 3:25
2. "Impossible" (Extended Version) - 3:25

B-side

1. "Impossible" (Instrumental) - 5:09
2. "Drive Slow" (feat. Paul Wall and GLC) (Strings Mix) - 5:41

Digital download

1. "Impossible" (Radio Edit) - 3:22

== Commercial performance ==
The track spent a total of 16 weeks on the US Billboard Hot R&B/Hip-Hop Songs chart and managed to reach its peak position of 54 on June 24, 2006, over a month after being released as a single. It reached number 27 on the US Bubbling Under Hot 100 Singles chart on May 27, 2006.

== Charts ==
| Chart (2006) | Peak position |
|---|---|
| US Bubbling Under Hot 100 (Billboard) | 3 |
| US Hot R&B/Hip-Hop Songs (Billboard) | 54 |
| US Pop 100 (Billboard) | 83 |
