= Melodramus =

Progressive metal band

- Origin: Salt Lake City, Utah, United States
- Genres: Progressive, metal, indie rock, pop, gothic
- Years active: 2005–2012, 2016–2019
- Labels: Song Haus Music, Sumthing Else Music Works
- Members: Zakkary Hale; Andrew Hopkins; Mikey Collard; Ted Newsom
- Website: http://www.Melodramus.com https://www.facebook.com/melodramus https://www.youtube.com/melodramus

Melodramus was an American progressive metal band from Salt Lake City, Utah, United States, who have released three studio albums, 30 Silver Pieces, Two: Glass Apple, and the comeback album 1+1=1. One of the songs from Two: Glass Apple was also released on the Speed Racer soundtrack released by Sumthing Else Music Works on November 16, 2010. The only song to feature Ted Newsom a.k.a. The Rose Phantom on lead vocals, "Searching," has been made into the first official Melodramus music video which was quickly followed by the ballad, "Suffer Like You."

Hale and Collard are currently in a new band called "Melō" with new drummer Jordan Davis.

As of 2023, all three Melodramus albums are available digitally, 30 Silver Pieces and Two: Glass Apple can also be purchased CD copies for.

== History ==
=== 2007–2012 ===
Melodramus, a four piece band released their first album, 30 Silver Pieces, in 2007.

The four original members, lead vocalist/guitarist Zakkary Hale, bassist Mikey Collard, drummer Andrew Hopkins, and keyboardist/backing vocalist Ted Newsom a.k.a. The Rose Phantom consistently put their musical minds and hearts together in Melodramus to create a sound that blends metal and progressive pop. In other words, a melting pot of genres makes up the lack thereof. Hale, Hopkins, and Collard set the basic foundation of Melodramus' sound with hours of carefully written guitar hooks and riffs, groovy bass lines, and precise and punchy drumming; all the while, The Rose Phantom put the icing on the cake by contributing layers of atmospheric sounds created from his collection of synthesizers and keyboards.

30 Silver Pieces, paved the beginning steps for the band. The album comprises more than one genre as elements of rock, metal, and pop weave in and out of songs. Three years following their first album allowed the band to grow on many different levels in terms of musicianship and songwriting through stages of time and trial. The next album, titled Two: Glass Apple, was released internationally on October 26, 2010, and is said to be vastly different sounding than the first. The new album was produced by Matt Winegar. (Primus, Faith No More, Coheed and Cambria.

After the release of Two: Glass Apple, The Rose Phantom Left the band.

In 2010, Mikey Collard left the band and was replaced by Trevor Alder.

== Side projects ==
Ted Newsom a.k.a. The Rose Phantom has released five albums outside of Melodramus, four with his new-age Darkwave, instrumental project, revideolized and one with Sleep Slid iN (formed in 2008) in which he and Whitney Willow share vocal duties.

Nine years into his career, The Rose Phantom's body of work attracted the attention of a filmmaker, and he was approached to create the soundtrack for an independent documentary film, Picking Up the Pieces. Shown at many film festivals, including Sundance in 2013, Picking Up the Pieces is about child prostitution in Cambodia, and required music that would set a very dark tone. The two tracks, over thirty minutes total, are very experimental and range from ambient, darkwave, to psychedelic rock. Released as a digital download only in June 2012, this project is both tense, and haunting.

Abandon, his first full-length release under his nom de musique, is an album over two years in the making. Produced by The Rose Phantom and the up-and-coming "Danegerous" Dane Morrow, the sound is a mix of pop rock and gothic darkwave, with hints of industrial. It's very close to being a concept album about personal struggle and self-doubt, with moments of hope and love.

== Discography ==
- 30 Silver Pieces (2007)
- Two: Glass Apple (2010)
- 1+1=1 (2019)

== Professional reviews ==
- GLORYDAZE Music's review of "Two: Glass Apple"
- SLUG Magazine's review of "Two: Glass Apple"
- SLUG Magazine's review of "30 Silver Pieces"

=== Interviews ===
- Melodramus on PCTV
- Revideolized (The Rose Phantom) on PCTV
