= Ratatouille: Food Frenzy =

2007 video game

- Developer: Helixe
- Publisher: THQ
- Platform: Nintendo DS
- Release: NA: October 29, 2007; EU: February 15, 2008
- Genre: Simulation
- Mode: Single-player

Ratatouille: Food Frenzy is a 2007 cookery simulation-styled minigame compilation video game developed by Helixe and published by THQ for the Nintendo DS. It was released in North America in October 2007, and in Europe in February 2008. It is based on the film Ratatouille.

== Plot ==
The game follows shortly after the events of the movie. With Gusteau's permanently closed from health violations, Remy is now the head chef at La Ratatouille bistro. He must lead his team of humans and rats alike to clean around the kitchen and prepare the finest cuisine for his patrons.

== Gameplay ==
Gameplay sees the player using the touch screen to play basic mini games usually throwing something from the bottom screen onto the top (for example flipping pans of fried fish onto the plates of the servers or throwing sponges at snails to stop them from making a mess).

The game includes the cooking minigame from the DS version of the movie game where players create dishes by chopping and slicing ingredients on the bottom screen similar to the Cooking Mama series.

== Reception ==
Ratatouille: Food Frenzy received mostly negative reviews from reviewers who criticized the lack of content in the game; the game received a 48% on Metacritic. IGN's Chris Adams felt that the game's seven minigames were too difficult for the target demographic and that it recycled content from another game based on the same movie, Ratatouille.
