= Whiplash (soundtrack) =

Whiplash (Original Motion Picture Soundtrack)

Soundtrack album by Justin Hurwitz
- Released: October 7, 2014
- Recorded: 2014
- Genre: Jazz; classical
- Length: 54:59
- Label: Varèse Sarabande
- Producer: Justin Hurwitz; Tim Simonec

Justin Hurwitz chronology
Guy and Madeline on a Park Bench (2009)	Whiplash (2014)	La La Land (2016)

Whiplash (Original Motion Picture Soundtrack) is the soundtrack album to the 2014 film Whiplash, directed by Damien Chazelle. The soundtrack was released on October 7, 2014, by Varèse Sarabande and features 24 tracks, which were split into three parts. Each part consists of varied musical selections, original jazz pieces, original underscore parts and classical jazz standards that featured various artists, including Stan Getz, Duke Ellington and other musicians. A deluxe edition of the soundtrack was released in March 2020.

== Development ==
The album and score was produced by Justin Hurwitz, with Tim Simonec conducting the score pieces. Hurwitz did not score for the original short film under the same title and which, the film is based on, as it did not have original music, apart from the track "Whiplash". However, when the film was adapted into feature, Chazelle roped him to score for the film, which he said "I thought the short was spectacular, it really showed Damien's visual and editing language, it had everything that would go into the feature [...] The filmmaking took a step up, and all the credit goes to Damien." It is his second film he collaborated with Chazelle after Guy and Madeline on a Park Bench (2009), which marked both Chazelle and Hurwitz's feature film debut.

Hurwitz described about the contrast between Neiman's (Miles Teller) and Fletcher's (J. K. Simmons) music. While Neiman's music plays feverishly throughout the film, Fletcher was seen playing music at few instances, where Hurwitz wrote a tender piano piece for him in the film, contrast to his character. The title song was not featured in full in the film, as "sections of it were played during the rehearsal scene being interrupted with Fletcher stopping the tune recurrently, because of mistakes". While scoring the tracks in the practice sessions, it was generally designed to become "more intense" as the film goes on.

The overture plays twice in the film. He modelled the track after the Buddy Rich big band style, which was fast and complicated. He added "From an arrangement standpoint it's complicated because it's also based on the theme of the movie. We had started talking very early about what that theme could be, and what's important to Damien and me is that scores are thematically economical, they don't keep throwing new melodies at you. You establish one or two melodies and use as them in as many ways as possible. So that overture that plays for a little bit at the beginning establishes a theme that we hear in many of the score cues. We hear tender versions of it, unsettling versions of it, then in the end, it's this big, fast big band piece."

On the instrumentation of the score, Hurwitz said:

"We knew that the underscore shouldn't be big band jazz, since there was already so much of that on screen and elsewhere in the movie. We knew that an orchestral score would be stylistically wrong, and that an electronic score wouldn't make sense in a movie about musicianship and instruments. So we came up with the idea of building a score using the techniques of electronic scoring, but using 100% real instruments — in fact, only the instruments in a big band lineup. With this approach, we would have a score that felt atmospheric like an electronic score without actually being electronic, and organic to the movie's existing soundscape, without feeling like just more big band music."

The score cues were produced one note per time, to layer and manipulate the notes as other musicians cannot. The resulting textures are reminiscent of an electronic score, except for each note was either a sax, trumpet, trombone, piano, vibe, or upright bass. The majority of the notes in this score are slowed down to about one-third per time, creating a hellish version of a big band sound. A melodic tune was woven into the score in major, minor, and other modes, depending on the situation. The track "When I Wake" was not included in the standard edition, but later released in the deluxe edition of the soundtrack. He wrote for the initial short film, to sound for a film that took place in the 1930s. Nicholas Britell co-produced the track with Hurwitz, which provided a vinyl sound. The actual drummer was Bernie Dresel.

== Track listings ==
=== Standard edition ===
The standard edition tracklist was released in September 2014; The album has 24 tracks divided into three subsections, based on the musical arrangements. It was released on Varèse Sarabande, on October 7, 2014.

I Want to Be One of the Greats
No.	Title	Performer(s)	Length
1.	"Snare Liftoff"	Justin Hurwitz	0:43
2.	"Overture"	Justin Hurwitz	3:19
3.	"Too Hip to Retire"	Tim Simonec	3:03
4.	"Whiplash"	Hank Levy	1:55
5.	"Fletcher's Song in Club"	Justin Hurwitz	1:28
6.	"Caravan"	Duke Ellington; Juan Tizol	9:14

If You Want the Part, Earn It
No.	Title	Performer(s)	Length
1.	"What's Your Name"	Justin Hurwitz	1:30
2.	"Practicing"	Justin Hurwitz	1:43
3.	"Invited"	Justin Hurwitz	0:54
4.	"Call From Dad"	Justin Hurwitz	0:41
5.	"Accident"	Justin Hurwitz	5:21
6.	"Hug from Dad"	Justin Hurwitz	1:19
7.	"Drum & Drone"	Justin Hurwitz	1:34
8.	"Carnegie"	Justin Hurwitz	0:36
9.	"Ryan / Breakup"	Justin Hurwitz	0:31
10.	"Drum Battle"	Justin Hurwitz	2:21
11.	"Dismissed"	Justin Hurwitz	2:51

He Was a Beautiful Player
No.	Title	Performer(s)	Length
1.	"Good Job"	Justin Hurwitz	1:28
2.	"Intoit"	Stan Getz	3:19
3.	"No Two Words"	Nicholas Britell	1:41
4.	"When I Wake"	Justin Hurwitz	3:50
5.	"Casey's Song"	Justin Hurwitz	1:57
6.	"Upswingin'"	Justin Hurwitz	2:12
7.	"Rehearsal Medley: First Nassau Band Rehearsal / Second Nassau Band Rehearsal / Studio Band Eavesdrop / Studio Band Rehearsal After Breakup"	Justin Hurwitz	1:34

=== Deluxe edition ===
On March 27, 2020, a deluxe edition of the soundtrack was released. It also featured the tracks from the standard edition, as well as remixes performed by Timo Garcia, Opiuo, Murray A. Lightburn and few unreleased score material. The deluxe edition was released on double CD and 2-LP gatefold sleeve vinyl with new cover art.

Disc 1
No.	Title	Performer(s)	Length
1.	"Snare Liftoff"	Justin Hurwitz	0:43
2.	"Overture"	Justin Hurwitz	3:19
3.	"Too Hip to Retire"	Tim Simonec	3:03
4.	"Whiplash"	Hank Levy	1:55
5.	"Upswingin'"	Justin Hurwitz	2:12
6.	"Rehearsal Medley: First Nassau Band Rehearsal / Second Nassau Band Rehearsal / Studio Band Eavesdrop / Studio Band Rehearsal After Breakup"	Justin Hurwitz	1:34
7.	"Caravan"	Duke Ellington; Juan Tizol	9:14
8.	"What's Your Name"	Justin Hurwitz	1:30
9.	"Practicing"	Justin Hurwitz	1:43
10.	"Invited"	Justin Hurwitz	0:54
11.	"Call From Dad"	Justin Hurwitz	0:41
12.	"Accident"	Justin Hurwitz	5:21
13.	"Hug from Dad"	Justin Hurwitz	1:19
14.	"Drum & Drone"	Justin Hurwitz	1:34
15.	"Carnegie"	Justin Hurwitz	0:36
16.	"Ryan / Breakup"	Justin Hurwitz	0:31
17.	"Drum Battle"	Justin Hurwitz	2:21
18.	"Dismissed"	Justin Hurwitz	2:51
19.	"Good Job"	Justin Hurwitz	1:28

Disc 2
No.	Title	Performer(s)	Length
1.	"Intoit"	Stan Getz	3:19
2.	"No Two Words"	Nicholas Britell	1:41
3.	"When I Wake"	Justin Hurwitz	3:50
4.	"Casey's Song"	Justin Hurwitz	1:57
5.	"Fletcher's Song in Club"	Justin Hurwitz	1:28
6.	"Keep Me Waiting"	Dana Williams	2:19
7.	"Fletcher's Song"	Justin Hurwitz	1:37
8.	"When I Wake" (Reprise)	Justin Hurwitz; Jullanar Gamboa	2:45
9.	"Upswingin'" (Bad Drumming)	Tim Simonec	1:22
10.	"Caravan" (Bad Drumming)	John Wasson	1:41
11.	"Fletcher's Song in Club" (Hälder Flip)	Justin Hurwitz; Hälder	2:23
12.	"Overture" (Opiuo Remix)	Justin Hurwitz; Opiuo	4:16
13.	"Caravan" (Timo Garcia Remix)	Justin Hurwitz; Timo Garcia	4:24
14.	"New York City And You"	Justin Hurwitz; Murray Lightburn	2:40
15.	"Came To Win"	Justin Hurwitz; Konrad OldMoney; Junoflo	1:48
16.	"Fletcher's Song" (DoWork Remix)	Justin Hurwitz; DoWork	2:36
17.	"Casey's Song" (The Tao of Groove)	Justin Hurwitz; The Tao of Groove	3:08

== Reception ==
Nola.com's Mike Scott stated "An infectious blend of standards and new compositions from Justin Hurwitz and Tim Simonec, it's chock-full of jazzy gems." Thomas Erlewine of AllMusic wrote "the Whiplash soundtrack winds up playing more like a film than a jazz album: it has its own singular momentum and drama that wind up overshadowing whatever long-shaded pieces that reside on the record." Den Of Geek wrote "Whiplash‘s soundtrack is a precisely tuned machine. The album groups things into clear groups: original songs, original score and familiar standards. Within the film itself, things unfold in a very different (and equally deliberate) order. Justin Hurwitz's score sets the mood with a chirpy overture, full of dancing saxophones and parping trumpets. It blends seamlessly with the vibe of the standards that are featured."

== Accolades ==
Award	Date of ceremony	Category	Recipient(s)	Result	Ref(s)
Grammy Awards	February 15, 2016	Best Score Soundtrack for Visual Media	Justin Hurwitz	Nominated	
St. Louis Gateway Film Critics Association	December 15, 2014	Best Music Soundtrack	Whiplash	Nominated	
