= Speed Racer (soundtrack) =

Soundtrack album by Michael Giacchino
- Released: May 6, 2008 (U.S.); June 25, 2008 (Japan)
- Genre: Film score
- Length: 60:26
- Label: Varèse Sarabande
- Producer: Michael Giacchino

Michael Giacchino chronology
Cloverfield (2008)	Speed Racer (2008)	Star Trek (2009)

Speed Racer: Original Motion Picture Score is the soundtrack of the film of the same name, which is based on the Japanese anime and manga series Speed Racer by Tatsunoko Productions. The score was composed by Michael Giacchino. It was originally released on May 6, 2008 by Varèse Sarabande. In Japan, it was released by Geneon Entertainment on June 25, 2008.

The orchestral score is performed by the Hollywood Studio Symphony and conducted by Tim Simonec. Along with it an updated version of the "Go, Speed Racer, Go" theme song performed by Ali Dee and the Deekompressors was used in the film's ending credits. In 2007, its rights were purchased by The Wachowskis, the writer, producers and film's directors, for use in the film. "Go, Speed Racer, Go" was released as a single in the same day of the soundtrack's release. The soundtrack overall has been well received by music critics.

== Track listing ==
All music is composed by Michael Giacchino, Speed Racer theme composed by Nobuyoshi Koshibe.

No.	Title	Scene	Length
1.	"I Am Speed"	The film's opening title logo sequence.	0:37
2.	"World's Best Autopia"	While Rex is teaching young Speed how to drive the T180.	1:14
3.	"Thunderhead"	During the race at Thunderhead, where Speed is trying to beat Rex's record.	3:07
4.	"Tragic Story of Rex Racer"	During the montage of Rex's past, from him leaving home until his crash.	4:49
5.	"Vroom and Board"	The theme of the character Royalton, played while the Racer family is taking a tour through Royalton Industries.	3:38
6.	"World's Worst Road Rage"	During the car fight between Racer X and Cruncher Block's truck.	2:41
7.	"Racing's in Our Blood"	When Speed turns down Royalton's offer.	1:52
8.	"True Heart of Racing"	When Royalton explains the truth behind racing, as well as during the race at Fuji.	4:05
9.	"Casa Cristo"	During the first portion of the Casa Cristo cross-country rally.	4:02
10.	"End of the First Leg"	During the Ninja night attack after the first half of the Casa Cristo race.	2:20
11.	"Taejo Turns Trixie"	When Trixie stands in for Taejo for the second half of the Casa Cristo race.	1:37
12.	"Bumper to Bumper, Rail to Rail"	When Speed rescues Trixie from being attacked by Snake Oiler; also features the musical passage from the hand-to-hand duel between Cruncher Block's gang and the Racer family at the pass before the Maltese Ice Cave.	3:07
13.	"The Maltese Ice Cave"	During the Maltese Ice Cave sequence.	2:04
14.	"Go Speed, Go!"	When Speed recovers after being knocked over the edge of the cliff by Snake Oiler.	1:24
15.	"He Ain't Heavy"	When Speed speaks with Racer X at Thunderhead at night.	1:45
16.	"32 Hours"	While the Racers build the new Mach 6 and Royalton cuts his deal with Musha.	3:49
17.	"Grand Ol' Prix"	During the first leg of the Grand Prix.	6:13
18.	"Reboot"	When the Mach 6's turbine dies and Speed jump-starts it to get back in the race.	3:08
19.	"Let Us Drink Milk"	After Speed's victory at the Grand Prix, and during Racer X's final reveal.	4:33
20.	"Speed Racer"	End credits song, played after Ali Dee and the Deekompressors' remix. The classic theme with lyric samples from the original U.S. and Japanese versions.	4:21
Total length:			60:26

== Reception ==
Professional ratings
Review scores
Source	Rating
AllMusic	4/5 stars
Empire	3/5 stars
Filmtracks.com	3.37/5 stars
Film Music Magazine	B+
iF Magazine	B+
Soundtrack.net	4/5 stars
Tracksounds.com	8/10 stars

The score received favorable responses. Allmusic stated it has "enough emotive interludes and lounge-tinged asides to render Austin Powers a period drama", while praised as "one of the most satisfying audio jumps from TV to the big screen since Danny Elfman's score for 1989's Michael Keaton-era Batman." Soundtrack.net said Giacchino "organically rearranging the little pieces as various leitmotifs throughout the movie" and "mines the entire late 60's for other pastiches", calling it "one of the best scores of the year." Giacchino remained "fairly faithful to the original score from the TV-series", and he was "able to inject his own sense of retro-flair that makes Speed Racer one score you might consider racing out to get", according to Tracksounds.com. The New York Times noted "some of what you see in Speed Racer is indeed beautiful (as is the slyly old-fashioned orchestral score by Michael Giacchino)."

Film Music Magazine qualified it "as energizing a ride as any musically re-tooled cartoon standard can hope for", adding it is "the musical equivalent of the film – garishly colorful, swingingly energetic – and a whole lot more sensical than the movie itself." It was described as "the real gusto" of the film by Empire. While praised Giacchino incorporation of the original themes, Daniel Schweiger of iF Magazine said it doesn't mean it "is lacking his own style." Schweiger stated the soundtrack "triumphs as the musical equivalent of the film- garishly colorful, swingingly energetic- and a whole lot more sensical than the movie itself." On the other hand, Filmtracks.com remarked it "start well, interestingly, with 'I Am Speed'" and that fans of the original show's music will appreciate the score. However, he criticized it for being "simply too explosively loud and incessantly enthusiastic to tolerate for lengthy periods of time", comparing it to "television commercials who try to sell you household cleaning products while shouting their praise for the item and never yielding to take a breath."
