= Star Trek (2009 soundtrack) =

Star Trek: Music from the Motion Picture

Soundtrack album by Michael Giacchino
- Released: May 5, 2009 (Original); June 14, 2010 (Deluxe Edition)
- Recorded: October 2008; Sony Scoring Stage, Culver City, California
- Genres: Film score, Classical
- Length: 45:26 (Original); 98:50 (Deluxe Edition)
- Label: Varèse Sarabande
- Producers: Michael Giacchino, J. J. Abrams, Bryan Burk

Michael Giacchino chronology
Speed Racer (2008)	Star Trek: Music from the Motion Picture (2009)	Up (2009)

Professional ratings
Review scores
Source	Rating
AllMusic	4/5 stars
Empire	4/5 stars
Filmtracks.com	4/5 stars

Star Trek: Music from the Motion Picture is a soundtrack album for the 2009 film Star Trek, composed and arranged by Michael Giacchino. The score was recorded in October 2008 since the film was originally scheduled to be released the following December. It was performed by the Hollywood Studio Symphony and Page LA Studio Voices at the Sony Scoring Stage in Culver City, California. The score incorporates the "Theme from Star Trek" by Alexander Courage and Gene Roddenberry.

== Track listing ==
#	Name	Length	Description
1	"Star Trek"	1:03	This is the fanfare for the Paramount Pictures, Spyglass Entertainment, and Bad Robot logos, as well as the leitmotif for the rest of the film.
2	"Nailin' the Kelvin"	2:09	The USS Kelvin is attacked by the Romulan vessel Narada.
3	"Labor of Love"	2:51	Winona Kirk gives birth to James T. Kirk aboard a medical shuttle while George Samuel Kirk sacrifices his life and the Kelvin to save her crew.
4	"Hella Bar Talk"	1:55	Christopher Pike persuades Kirk to enlist in Starfleet after the barfight. Then Kirk travels to see the Enterprise under construction on Earth, and he chooses to enlist, meeting Captain Pike's shuttle at a nearby Starfleet facility.
5	"Enterprising Young Men"	2:39	This is the introduction of the USS Enterprise and as McCoy moves an ill Kirk to sickbay. Also, a shorter version is used on the main title following the destruction of the Kelvin.
6	"Nero Sighted"	3:23	The Enterprise encounters the Narada within orbit of Vulcan.
7	"Nice to Meld You"	3:13	On the ice planet Delta Vega, Spock Prime performs a mind-meld on Kirk to explain his presence and the actions of Nero.
8	"Run and Shoot Offense"	2:04	On board the Narada, Kirk and Spock start a gunfight with the Romulans.
9	"Does It Still McFly?"	2:03	Kirk and Spock observe the interior of the Jellyfish.
10	"Nero Death Experience"	5:38	The Enterprise engages the Narada in a final showdown.
11	"Nero Fiddles, Narada Burns"	2:34	As the Narada is consumed by the black hole, the Enterprise fires her phasers and torpedoes to put Nero out of his misery.
12	"Back from Black"	0:59	The Enterprise ejects and detonates her warp drive reactor cores to escape the black hole.
13	"That New Car Smell"	4:46	Spock is convinced by his future self to remain in Starfleet, while Kirk is promoted to captain and takes the Enterprise on her next voyage.
14	"To Boldly Go"	0:26	The Star Trek fanfare plays while Spock Prime recites the mantra.
15	"End Credits"	9:11	The end credits incorporate the "Theme from Star Trek."

== The Deluxe Edition ==
In 2010, Varèse Sarabande released a greatly expanded 5000-copy limited edition album of the score entitled Star Trek: The Deluxe Edition. Now out of print, the album features many previously unreleased cues, including ones for the fight on the drill and Spock's attempt to save his mother. In addition, there was an accident in the printing of the deluxe edition's CD booklet. A completely different list of orchestra player names was printed by accident, instead of the group that actually performed the score for the film. A correct listing of the orchestra players who actually performed the score can be found, properly credited and listed, in the booklet that came with the original one-disc edition of the soundtrack. In 2019, Varèse Sarabande issued a 1500 limited edition reissue.

Album cues from the original CD are bolded in the following track listing, though the lengths of several of the original CD cues are different.

Disc 1:

No.	Title	Length
1.	"**Star Trek**"	2:26
2.	"Narada Boom"	2:51
3.	"Hack to the Future"	1:23
4.	"**Nailin' the Kelvin**"	2:10
5.	"**Labor of Love**"	2:44
6.	"Main Title"	0:46
7.	"Head to Heart Conversation"	1:08
8.	"One Proud Mother"	1:38
9.	"**Hella Bar Talk**"	1:55
10.	"The Flask at Hand"	0:29
11.	"Welcome Back, Spock"	1:09
12.	"Vulcan Gets a Good Drilling"	1:30
13.	"Hangar Management"	2:46
14.	"**Enterprising Young Men**"	3:05
15.	"Flying Into a Trap"	3:24
16.	"**Nero Sighted**"	3:23
17.	"Matter? I Barely Know Her!"	2:05
18.	"Jehosafats"	3:03
19.	"Chutes and Matter"	3:23
20.	"A Whole In My Hearth"	0:56
21.	"I've Fallen and I Can't Beam Up!"	1:51
22.	"Spock Goes Spelunking"	1:28
23.	"An Endangered Species"	3:10
24.	"Galaxy's Worst Sushi Bar"	2:14
25.	"Mandatory Leave of Absence"	1:19
26.	"Dad's Route to School"	0:34
27.	"Frozen Dinner"	1:30
28.	"You Snowin' Me?"	0:50

Disc 2:

No.	Title	Length
1.	"**Nice to Meld You**"	3:14
2.	"Hail to the Chief"	0:52
3.	"I Gotta Beam Me"	2:02
4.	"Scotty's Tanked"	1:37
5.	"What's with You?"	2:12
6.	"Either Way, Someone's Going Down"	2:44
7.	"Trekking Down the Narada"	2:31
8.	"**Run And Shoot Offense**"	2:03
9.	"**Does It Still McFly?**"	2:02
10.	"**Nero Death Experience**"	5:38
11.	"**Nero Fiddles, Narada Burns**"	2:28
12.	"Black Holes Have a Lot of Pull"	0:55
13.	"**Back From Black**"	0:57
14.	"**That New Car Smell**"	4:46
15.	"**To Boldly Go**"	0:26
16.	"**End Credits**"	9:11

== Personnel ==
Credits derived from Allmusic:

Production

- Michael Giacchino – composer, producer, arranger
- Alexander Courage – original material
- Gene Roddenberry – original material
- J. J. Abrams – executive producer
- Bryan Burk – executive producer
- Hollywood Studio Symphony – orchestra
- Reggie Wilson – orchestra contractor
- Page LA Studio Voices – choir/chorus
- Bobbi Page – vocal contractor

Orchestration and technical

- Peter Boyer – arranger, orchestration
- Richard Bronskill – arranger, orchestration
- Stephen M. Davis – audio engineer
- George Drakoulias – music consultant
- Jack Hayes – arranger, orchestration
- Larry Kenton – orchestration
- Erick Labson – mastering, remastering
- Alex Levy – music editor
- Chad Seiter – orchestration
- Tim Simonec – arranger, conductor, orchestration
- Randy Spendlove – executive in charge of music
- Chris Tilton – arranger, orchestration
- Robert Townson – executive in charge of music
- Dan Wallin – audio engineer, mixing, recording
- Booker White – music preparation

== See also ==
- List of Star Trek composers and music
