= The Bourne Supremacy (soundtrack) =

The Bourne Supremacy: Original Motion Picture Soundtrack

Soundtrack album by John Powell
- Released: July 27, 2004
- Genre: Score
- Length: 44:20
- Label: Varèse Sarabande
- Producer: John Powell

Professional ratings
Review scores
Source	Rating
Allmusic	3.5/5 stars
Filmtracks	3/5 stars

The Bourne Supremacy: Original Motion Picture Soundtrack is the official soundtrack release to The Bourne Supremacy. It features selections of music by composer John Powell and Moby's "Extreme Ways", which was again featured over the film's closing credits as for The Bourne Identity, though the track was omitted from that film's soundtrack album release. The song "Intothinair" by Mocean Worker is featured during the Moscow club scene, but does not appear on the film's official soundtrack.

== Track listing ==
1. "Goa" – (3:00)
2. "The Drop" – (3:42)
3. "Funeral Pyre" – (2:21)
4. "Gathering Data" – (1:54)
5. "Nach Deutschland" – (2:40)
6. "To the Roof" – (5:32)
7. "New Memories" – (2:48)
8. "Berlin Foot Chase" – (5:16)
9. "Alexander Platz/Abbotts Confesses" – (3:34)
10. "Moscow Wind Up" – (6:54)
11. "Bim Bam Smash" – (5:09)
12. "Atonement" – (1:30)
13. "Extreme Ways" by Moby – (3:56)

== Personnel ==
- Music Performed by - The Hollywood Studio Symphony
- Orchestra Conducted by - Pete Anthony
- Orchestrations by - Elizabeth Finch, Bruce Fowler, Walter Fowler, Rick Giovinazzo, and Yvonne S. Moriarty
- Additional Music by - John Ashton Thomas
- Mixed by - Steve Kempster, Dennis S. Sands
- Edited by - Peter Myles
- Strings: 33 violins, 14 violas, 14 violoncellos, 10 double basses
- Woodwinds: 1 bassoon
- Brass: 6 French horns, 3 trumpets, 4 trombones
- Live Percussion: 4 players
- Drums: 3 players
- 2 guitars, 1 piano

== Awards ==
Won an ASCAP Award and nominated for two World Soundtrack Awards.
