= 30 Silver Pieces =

Studio album by Melodramus
- Released: July 31, 2007
- Genre: Progressive metal, rock, pop, synthpop
- Length: 70:27
- Label: Self-released
- Producer: Bruce Kirby

Melodramus chronology
30 Silver Pieces (2007)	Two: Glass Apple (2010)

30 Silver Pieces is the first studio album by Salt Lake City, Utah-based band Melodramus.

The album is currently available as a free download with option to name your own price.

== Track listing ==
Source: Amazon, CD Baby

No.	Title	Length
1.	"30 Silver Pieces"	4:52
2.	"Return"	3:52
3.	"Fly Away"	4:10
4.	"Lillium"	4:34
5.	"Touch Of Light"	4:35
6.	"Reflection (Solitude)"	4:10
7.	"Song Of Hope"	4:57
8.	"HALO"	4:08
9.	"Soundtrack"	4:43
10.	"Simple Words"	3:40
11.	"Bringin' It Down"	3:38
12.	"Angel's Landing"	5:10
13.	"Of Earth Inside"	5:55
14.	"Ocean Eyes"	12:03

== Personnel ==
- Zakkary Hale – Guitars/Lead Vocals
- Mikey Collard – Bass Guitar
- Andrew Hopkins – Percussion
- Ted Newsom aka The Rose Phantom – Keyboards/Backing vocals

=== Additional Personnel ===
- Matty Jones – Guest vocals on tracks 3 & 14
- Breanna White – Guest vocals on tracks 4 & 12
- Produced by Melodramus
- Co-produced by Bruce "Brewski" Kirby
- Engineered, mixed, and mastered by Bruce Kirby
