= Ratatouille (soundtrack) =

2007 film score by Michael Giacchino

Ratatouille (Original Motion Picture Soundtrack)

Film score by Michael Giacchino
- Released: June 26, 2007
- Recorded: 2006–2007
- Studios: Sony Pictures Studios, Culver City, CA
- Genres: Classical; film score; soundtrack
- Length: 62:23
- Label: Walt Disney
- Producer: Michael Giacchino

Michael Giacchino chronology
| Mission: Impossible III (2006) | Ratatouille (2007) | Cloverfield (2008) |

Ratatouille (Original Motion Picture Soundtrack) is the soundtrack album to the 2007 Disney/Pixar film of the same name composed and arranged by Michael Giacchino. The film marked Giacchino's second Pixar film after The Incredibles, which was also directed by Bird and also the second Pixar film not to be scored by Randy Newman or Thomas Newman. The album features original score cues, with an original song "Le Festin" written by Giacchino and performed by Camille, and was released by Walt Disney Records on June 26, 2007.

The score featured a diverse collection of influences of music genres: European romanticism, gypsy jazz, folk-pop and traditional elements of Parisian café sounds. The music received critical acclaim, with critics praising the score as one of the best of Giacchino's career. Giacchino received his first Academy Award nomination for Best Original Score for Ratatoulille and won the Annie Award for Best Music in a Feature Production and his first Grammy Award for Best Score Soundtrack Album. A remastered double LP was released by Mondo, 10 years after the film's release in November 2017.

== Development ==
In an interview, Giacchino explained that Bird wanted him to "express the taste of food with music" to complement the movie doing the same with its visuals. To that end, he wrote two themes to express the two sides of Remy's personality: one for his creative, chef side, and one for his natural, thief side. He also wrote a buddy theme for both Remy and Linguini that plays when they are together.

Giacchino sought to "create a score that was not only drawn out of the city itself, but [also] out of the story of the film." He found that the depth of the story encouraged him to let "the characters and emotions...be the guide for [his] music." As a result, the score makes use of a wide range of instruments, including accordion, violin, jazz guitar, clarinet, and piano. The score was produced and recorded at Sony Pictures Studios with Tim Simonec as the orchestrator and conductor.

According to Entertainment Weekly, Giacchino said that "the film was different from scene to scene. When you go see a movie about rats, you're thinking it's going to be funny and slapstick — but this is an extremely emotional movie". In addition to the score, Giacchino wrote the main theme song, "Le Festin", about Remy and his dream to be a chef. Though Bird's initial films were not song-oriented, the necessity to include an original song was "to do something different and special", according to Giacchino. The song was the first cue he wrote for the film. French artist Camille (who was 29 at the time of the film's release) was hired to perform "Le Festin" after Giacchino listened to her music and realized she was perfect for the song; as a result, the song is sung in French in almost all versions of the film. The song was recorded in Vancouver.

In October 2015, coinciding with Ratatouille's premiere at the Royal Albert Hall, London, Giacchino conducted a live orchestral performance at the venue, which received widespread acclaim. Giacchino's themes were partly used in the unofficial musical performed by TikTok users through crowdfunding in November 2020, and new songs were performed by the cast.

== Track listing ==
All music/tracks composed and arranged by Michael Giacchino, except where noted.

Ratatouille (Original Motion Picture Soundtrack) track listing
| No. | Title | Length |
|---|---|---|
| 1. | "Le Festin" (performed by Camille) | 2:50 |
| 2. | "Welcome to Gusteau's" | 0:38 |
| 3. | "This Is Me" | 1:41 |
| 4. | "Granny Get Your Gun" | 2:01 |
| 5. | "100 Rat Dash" | 1:47 |
| 6. | "Wall Rat" | 2:41 |
| 7. | "Cast of Cooks" | 1:41 |
| 8. | "A Real Gourmet Kitchen" | 4:18 |
| 9. | "Souped Up" | 0:50 |
| 10. | "Is It Soup Yet?" | 1:16 |
| 11. | "A New Deal" | 1:56 |
| 12. | "Remy Drives a Linguini" | 2:26 |
| 13. | "Colette Shows Him le Ropes" | 2:56 |
| 14. | "Special Order" | 1:58 |
| 15. | "Kiss & Vinegar" | 1:54 |
| 16. | "Losing Control" | 2:04 |
| 17. | "Heist to See You" | 1:45 |
| 18. | "The Paper Chase" | 1:44 |
| 19. | "Remy's Revenge" | 3:24 |
| 20. | "Abandoning Ship" | 2:55 |
| 21. | "Dinner Rush" | 5:00 |
| 22. | "Anyone Can Cook" | 3:13 |
| 23. | "End Creditouilles" | 9:16 |
| 24. | "Ratatouille Main Theme" | 2:09 |
| Total length: | | 62:23 |

== Reception ==
Professional ratings
Review scores
| Source | Rating |
|---|---|
| AllMusic | 4/5 stars |
| Empire | 5/5 stars |
| Soundtrack.net | 3.5/5 stars |

The soundtrack received critical acclaim. Danny Graydon of Empire wrote, "Certainly, there's a heavy dose of predictability here given its use of practically every French music cliché there is (albeit rendered in a stylish jazz/waltz/salsa style), but the sheer verve, infectiously upbeat tone and creative use of special instrumentation swiftly renders that criticism moot - it's never less than utterly enjoyable." He added that the score was "an absolute treat - and arguably Giacchino's best." James Christopher Monger of AllMusic called it a "lively and endlessly inventive soundtrack that strikes a perfect balance between the old European drama of Ennio Morricone and the unhinged whimsy of Raymond Scott". He went on to write, "Like an Old World version of Giacchino's jazz-infused, comic-book-kissed score for The Incredibles, Ratatouille is both elegant and mad, built around a sweet and playful theme called 'Le Festin,' which is presented both instrumentally and vocally (sung by the charming French star Camille) and is as timeless as the dish for which the film is based."

== Accolades ==
Giacchino's score for Ratatouille was nominated for the Best Original Score category at the 80th Academy Awards. He won the Annie Award for Best Music in an Animated Feature Production and Best Score Soundtrack for Visual Media at the 50th Annual Grammy Awards. It further received two nominations at the Satellite Award for Best Original Score and at the World Soundtrack Award for Best Original Song Written for Film, for the song "Le Festin".
