= Tim Simonec =

American composer, orchestrator, conductor, and arranger

- Born: June 11, 1951 (age 75); Chicago, Illinois, US
- Occupations: Composer; conductor; orchestrator; arranger

Tim Simonec (born June 11, 1951) is an American composer, orchestrator, conductor, and arranger. He is known for his work in film music, composing for movies such as Whiplash and Dawn of the Planet of the Apes. He has a long-term partnership with Michael Giacchino, orchestrating and conducting for Jurassic World, Zootopia, Lost, and The Incredibles, among many others. He is also known for scoring the video games The Incredibles and Ratatouille. He was nominated for Best Instrumental Arrangement at the 52nd Annual Grammy Awards, alongside Giacchino, for his work on Up.
