= Ratatouille (video game) =

2007 video game

- Cover art poster
- Developers: Heavy Iron Studios (PS3/X360); Asobo Studio (PS2/Xbox/GC/Wii/PC/Mac); Locomotive Games (PSP); Helixe (GBA/DS)
- Publisher: THQ
- Director: Gregory Ecklund
- Producer: Brian Wiklem
- Designers: Earl Berkeley; Kevin Perry
- Programmer: Ryan Mapes
- Artists: Dorothy Chen; Sean Ro
- Writer: Patrick Hegarty
- Composer: Michael Giacchino (Note: Additional music by Tim Simonec, Chad Seiter and Andrea Datzman)
- Platforms: Microsoft Windows; OS X; PlayStation 2; GameCube; Xbox; Wii; Game Boy Advance; Nintendo DS; PlayStation Portable; Xbox 360; PlayStation 3; Mobile phone
- Release: NA: June 26, 2007; FR: August 3, 2007; EU: September 28, 2007; Xbox: NA: June 26, 2007; GameCube: NA: June 26, 2007; FR: August 3, 2007; PlayStation 3: FR: August 3, 2007; EU: September 28, 2007; NA: October 23, 2007
- Genre: Platform
- Mode: Single-player

Ratatouille is a 2007 platform video game based on the Pixar film of the same name, developed by Heavy Iron Studios and published by THQ. It mostly serves as a retelling of film's events with platforming sections. Several of the voice actors from the film, like Patton Oswalt as Remy, reprised their roles for the game. It was released on PlayStation 2, PlayStation 3, PlayStation Portable, Xbox, Xbox 360, Wii, Nintendo GameCube, Nintendo DS, Game Boy Advance, Microsoft Windows, Mac OS X and mobile phones.

Ratatouille was released for most major platforms at the time in North America on June 26, 2007. The game received mixed reviews from critics and sold around 4 million units worldwide. The game received an Annie Award for "Best Animated Video Game" at the 35th Annie Awards in 2008.

== Plot ==
Similar to the plot of the movie, the game starts in a farm setting. Remy goes off with his brother Emile to retrieve apple cores for his father Django. On the road trip he is taught the basic skills he will need to know so that he can pass what he will face later on. After the tutorial, Remy and Emile grab a cookbook by Remy's idol, the late Auguste Gusteau, so Remy can read it. They pull the book out of the window, which results in it shutting, awakening the old lady, who fires at the colony with a shotgun. Remy escapes with the book, and the colony escapes on homemade boats. Remy ends up taking a wrong turn in the sewers and ends up lost from his family. An imaginative vision of Gusteau pops from the book and tells Remy that he could regain one of his lost stars after Anton Ego's bad review. Remy agrees and travels under Paris’ streets and ends up at the restaurant. However, Remy falls from the window and lands in a pot sink. Remy attempts to escape but gets sidetracked by a rancid-smelling soup that was contaminated by the new garbage boy, Linguini. Remy makes the soup much better and nearly escapes down a kitchen pipe, which ends up back in the sewers. Remy reunites with Django and Emile and tells them that they and the other rats are going to steal dog scraps at the restaurant. The plan works successfully, but it results in Linguini chasing Remy when he sees the other rats leaving. Linguini crashes into some garbage cans, and the two make a deal to have Remy help Linguini out in the kitchen. Remy then leaves down another pipe and meets up with his dad again.

This part also gives more exploration of the sewers, including a bonus level and objects that decorate the colony's home. Remy returns to the kitchen to steal from the cooler and Remy helps Linguini three times when he's given a special order. Remy turns off the gas, which distracts the chefs and steals the key to open the cooler. The colony steals the food but the Head Chef Skinner spots him. Skinner chases Remy throughout the kitchen, but Skinner slips on a mop and crashes into a pile of pots and pans. Remy escapes through the cooler's pipes and meets with Django for their next heist.

Remy helps his colony steal prized foods at the market, but Skinner and the old lady from the cottage chase him. Skinner is then trapped in a freezer and escapes again. After that, the food critic Anton Ego, also known as the "Grim Eater," has arrived at Gusteau's for a review, one that will be important to the cooks. However, except for Linguini and the rôtisseuse Colette, they all leave after finding out about Remy. Remy discovers Skinner has laid traps everywhere and traps him in a closet. Remy, his rat colony, Linguini, and Colette cook for many people, including Ego. Skinner escapes the closet and chases Remy throughout Gusteau's restaurant, wrecking it in the process. While Remy manages to escape from Skinner (who is later crushed accidentally by the chandelier), the restaurant's credibility is lost due to the revelation of the rat colony's existence, and it is forced to close down. However, with Ego's funding, Linguini and Colette manage to open a bistro called "La Ratatouille" with Remy as its head chef.

== Development ==
In August 2004, THQ obtained the rights to make games based on Pixar's next four films. After the company's success of the first three games, The Incredibles, The Incredibles: Rise of the Underminer and Cars, THQ claimed that 25 million units of those games were sold, at the time of Ratatouille's announcement by THQ and Disney in November 2006, which would coincide with the movie. Several actors from the film voice their characters in the game, including Patton Oswalt as Remy.

== Reception ==
Reception

Aggregate score
Aggregator	Score									
Aggregator	DS	GBA	GameCube	PC	PS2	PS3	PSP	Wii	Xbox	Xbox 360
Metacritic	64/100	65/100	60/100	65/100	65/100	55/100	64/100	62/100	60/100	56/100

Review scores
Publication	Score									
Publication	DS	GBA	GameCube	PC	PS2	PS3	PSP	Wii	Xbox	Xbox 360
1Up.com	N/A	N/A	C	N/A	N/A	N/A	C	C	N/A	N/A
Eurogamer	N/A	N/A	N/A	N/A	N/A	N/A	N/A	N/A	N/A	5/10
Game Informer	N/A	N/A	5.5/10	N/A	5.5/10	N/A	N/A	5.5/10	N/A	6.75/10
GameSpot	7/10	6.5/10	6/10	6/10	6/10	N/A	6.5/10	6/10	6/10	4.5/10
GameZone	6.5/10	5/10	6.1/10	N/A	7.4/10	6.7/10	6.2/10	7.1/10	N/A	6.6/10
IGN	7/10	7/10	6.5/10	N/A	6.5/10	5.5/10	6.8/10	7/10	N/A	5.5/10
Nintendo Power	N/A	N/A	N/A	N/A	N/A	N/A	N/A	7.5/10	N/A	N/A
Nintendo World Report	7/10	N/A	N/A	N/A	N/A	N/A	N/A	4/10	N/A	N/A
Official Xbox Magazine (US)	N/A	N/A	N/A	N/A	N/A	N/A	N/A	N/A	N/A	5/10
PALGN	5.5/10	N/A	N/A	7/10	N/A	N/A	N/A	5.5/10	N/A	N/A

Ratatouille received "mixed or average" reviews, according to review aggregator website Metacritic.

Alex Navarro of GameSpot gave most versions of the game a score of 6 out of 10 and called it "a sufficient, if unfulfilling, platformer". Navarro wrote: "There's little difference to speak of between any of the older console, PC, or Wii versions of Ratatouille. The PC version predictably looks the sharpest, and the PS2 version looks the dullest, though the differences are minor all around" and said "the PC version requires a decent gamepad to play properly, and the Wii version dabbles in motion controls". Navarro said the gameplay is fine for younger players but too simplistic for older players. He said the film's cast gives solid voice work but that the missions are a bit dull and repetitive. Navarro wrote "if your kid is desperate to relive Remy's adventures for him or herself, Ratatouille isn't a bad game to rent" and also wrote "it's the sort of game that will satisfy a younger fan of the film for a few lazy afternoon hours, and then be forgotten about immediately afterward".

Justin Davis of Modojo.com gave the mobile phone version of the game by THQ Wireless a rating of 3 stars out of 5. Davis said the game appears like the game Diner Dash, but it's set in the kitchen instead of the dining area and instead of serving drinks, the player is dropping meat onto a stove, and Linguini's hands are controlled independently. Davis said the game was a "pleasant surprise" but that it was a little too short, with not enough depth. Louis Bedigian of GameZone gave the mobile phone version a score of 7.7 out of 10, and IGN gave it 7.5.

The game shipped nearly 4 million copies.

The video game won the award for the "Best Animated Video Game" award at the Annies in 2008.
