= Hollywood Studio Symphony =

Symphony orchestra centered on Hollywood

- Studio orchestra
- Location: Hollywood, Los Angeles, California, U.S.

The Hollywood Studio Symphony (sometimes the Hollywood Freelance Studio Symphony) is the credited name of the symphony orchestra behind many major soundtracks, including The Chronicles of Narnia: The Lion, the Witch and the Wardrobe, Jaws, Jurassic Park, Ghostbusters, Pirates of the Caribbean, Spider-Man 2, Lost, and The Bourne Supremacy. Contrary to what its name might suggest, the orchestra is not a conventional symphony orchestra, in that all of its members are freelance musicians who are contracted individually and differ across individual soundtracks.

== Background ==
Often in soundtracks, the individual members of the orchestra that perform the actual score are not credited (with some exceptions being the "orchestra leader" or concertmaster). Usually, only the "orchestra contractor" is credited.

The use of the "Hollywood Studio Symphony" name is part of a 2001 contract negotiated between the American Federation of Musicians (AFM) and the Alliance of Motion Picture and Television Producers to provide an incentive for soundtracks to be recorded with Los Angeles musicians instead of foreign musicians and recording venues (often in London and Prague) who were cheaper. In the new contract, the AFM musicians agreed to lower their record rates in exchange for individual credits to all the musicians who perform the score as well as recognition for the local community venture. Thus, the "Hollywood Studio Symphony" name is given to the entire ensemble in addition to the individual musician credits as a way to brand the Los Angeles effort.

== Filmography ==
=== Film ===
Year	Title	Composer	Conductor	Orchestrator
1951	David and Bathsheba	Alfred Newman	Alfred Newman	Edward B. Powell
1954	Hell and High Water	Alfred Newman	Alfred Newman	Edward B. Powell
1955	The Girl in the Red Velvet Swing	Leigh Harline	Lionel Newman	
1961	Breakfast at Tiffany's	Henry Mancini	Henry Mancini	Leo Shuken & Jack Hayes
1962	Lonely Are the Brave	Jerry Goldsmith	Joseph Gershenson	Jerry Goldsmith & David Tamkin
1963	The List of Adrian Messenger	Jerry Goldsmith	Jerry Goldsmith	David Tamkin
1963	The Great Escape	Elmer Bernstein	Elmer Bernstein	Leo Shuken & Jack Hayes
1965	The Great Race	Henry Mancini	Henry Mancini	Henry Mancini
1965	The Sons of Katie Elder	Elmer Bernstein	Elmer Bernstein	Leo Shuken & Jack Hayes
1966	Moment to Moment	Henry Mancini	Henry Mancini	
1967	The St. Valentine's Day Massacre	Lionel Newman & Fred Steiner	Lionel Newman	
1968	The Devil's Brigade	Alex North	Alex North	Henry Brant
1970	Patton	Jerry Goldsmith	Jerry Goldsmith	Arthur Morton
1970	The Mask of Sheba	Lalo Schifrin	Lalo Schifrin	Lalo Schifrin
1970	THX 1138	Lalo Schifrin	Lalo Schifrin	Lalo Schifrin
1970	Kelly's Heroes	Lalo Schifrin	Lalo Schifrin	Richard Hazard
1971	Escape from the Planet of the Apes	Jerry Goldsmith	Jerry Goldsmith	Arthur Morton & Alexander Courage
1971	Dirty Harry	Lalo Schifrin	Lalo Schifrin	Lalo Schifrin
1972	The Cowboys	John Williams	John Williams	Herbert W. Spencer & Alexander Courage
1972	The Poseidon Adventure	John Williams	John Williams	Alexander Courage
1972	The Godfather	Nino Rota	Carlo Savina	
1973	Shamus	Jerry Goldsmith	Jerry Goldsmith	
1973	Magnum Force	Lalo Schifrin	Lalo Schifrin	Richard Hazard & Lalo Schifrin
1973	Enter the Dragon	Lalo Schifrin	Lalo Schifrin	Lalo Schifrin & Richard Hazard
1974	Blazing Saddles	John Morris	John Morris	Jonathan Tunick
1974	The Godfather Part II	Nino Rota	Carmine Coppola	
1974	The Yakuza	Dave Grusin	Dave Grusin	Dave Grusin, Leo Shuken & Jack Hayes
1975	Rooster Cogburn	Laurence Rosenthal	Laurence Rosenthal	
1975	The Eiger Sanction	John Williams	John Williams	Herbert W. Spencer & Albert Woodbury
1975	Jaws	John Williams	John Williams	Herbert W. Spencer
1975	Once is Not Enough	Henry Mancini	Henry Mancini	Leo Shuken, Jack Hayes & Henry Mancini
1976	Midway	John Williams	John Williams	John Williams
1976	Silver Streak	Henry Mancini	Henry Mancini	Jack Hayes
1976	Sky Riders	Lalo Schifrin	Lalo Schifrin	Lalo Schifrin
1976	Murder by Death	Dave Grusin	Richard Berres	Dave Grusin
1977	Demon Seed	Jerry Fielding	Jerry Fielding	Lennie Niehaus & Greig McRitchie
1977	Days of the Animals	Lalo Schifrin	Lalo Schifrin	Lalo Schifrin
1977	Audrey Rose	Michael Small	Michael Small	Jack Hayes
1977	Black Sunday	John Williams	John Williams	Herbert W. Spencer
1977	Bobby Deerfield	Dave Grusin	Dave Grusin	Dave Grusin
1977	The Car	Leonard Rosenman	Leonard Rosenman	Ralph Ferraro
1977	Close Encounters of the Third Kind	John Williams	John Williams	Herbert W. Spencer
1977	Rollercoaster	Lalo Schifrin	Lalo Schifrin	Lalo Schifrin
1977	Telefon	Lalo Schifrin	Lalo Schifrin	Richard Hazard
1977	The Deep	John Barry	John Barry	
1977	The Gauntlet	Jerry Fielding	Jerry Fielding	Lennie Niehaus & Greig McRitchie
1977	The Choirboys	Frank De Vol	Frank De Vol	Lyn Murray, Jack Pleis, & Albert Woodbury
1977	MacArthur	Jerry Goldsmith	Jerry Goldsmith	Arthur Morton
1978	Gray Lady Down	Jerry Fielding	Jerry Fielding	Lennie Niehaus
1978	Big Wednesday	Basil Poledouris	Basil Poledouris	Greig McRitchie
1978	Capricorn One	Jerry Goldsmith	Jerry Goldsmith	Arthur Morton
1978	The Swarm	Jerry Goldsmith	Jerry Goldsmith	Arthur Morton & Franklin Daniel
1978	Who'll Stop the Rain	Laurence Rosenthal	Laurence Rosenthal	Herbert W. Spencer
1978	Five Days from Home	Bill Conti	Bill Conti	Peter Myers
1978	Nunzio	Lalo Schifrin	Lalo Schifrin	Jack Hayes & Lalo Schifrin
1978	Damien: Omen II	Jerry Goldsmith	Lionel Newman	Arthur Morton
1978	Jaws 2	John Williams	John Williams	Herbert W. Spencer & Alexander Courage
1978	Animal House	Elmer Bernstein	Elmer Bernstein	David Spear & Peter Bernstein
1978	Return From Witch Mountain	Lalo Schifrin	Lalo Schifrin	Lalo Schifrin
1978	The Big Fix	Bill Conti	Bill Conti	
1979	Star Trek: The Motion Picture	Jerry Goldsmith	Jerry Goldsmith	Arthur Morton
1979	The Great Santini	Elmer Bernstein	Elmer Bernstein	David Spear & Peter Bernstein
1979	The Black Hole	John Barry	John Barry	Albert Woodbury
1979	The Amityville Horror	Lalo Schifrin	Lalo Schifrin	Richard Hazard
1979	Meteor	Laurence Rosenthal	Laurence Rosenthal	Arthur Morton, Jack Hayes, Herbert W. Spencer & Laurence Rosenthal
1979	The Champ	Dave Grusin	Dave Grusin	Dave Grusin
1979	1941	John Williams	John Williams	Herbert W. Spencer
1979	Rocky II	Bill Conti	Bill Conti	Peter Myers
1979	...And Justice for All	Dave Grusin	Dave Grusin	Billy May, Dale Oehler, & Dave Grusin
1980	Brubaker	Lalo Schifrin	Lalo Schifrin	Jack Hayes
1980	Airplane!	Elmer Bernstein	Elmer Bernstein	David Spear
1981	Stripes	Elmer Bernstein	Elmer Bernstein	David Spear & Peter Bernstein
1981	Escape to Victory	Bill Conti	Bill Conti	Peter T. Myers
1981	Taps	Maurice Jarre	Maurice Jarre	
1981	Heartbeeps	John Williams	John Williams	Herbert W. Spencer
1981	Absence of Malice	Dave Grusin	Dave Grusin	
1982	Tootsie	Dave Grusin	Dave Grusin	Dave Grusin
1982	Poltergeist	Jerry Goldsmith	Jerry Goldsmith	Arthur Morton
1982	E.T. the Extra-Terrestrial	John Williams	John Williams	Angela Morley & Herbert W. Spencer
1982	Star Trek II: The Wrath of Khan	James Horner	James Horner	Jack Hayes
1982	I, the Jury	Bill Conti	Bill Conti	Bill Conti
1982	Rocky III	Bill Conti	Bill Conti	Peter Myers & Bill Conti
1982	That Championship Season	Bill Conti	Bill Conti	Bill Conti & Loree Myers
1983	Something Wicked This Way Comes	James Horner	James Horner	James Horner & Greig McRitchie
1983	WarGames	Arthur B. Rubinstein	Arthur B. Rubinstein	Mark Hoder & Arthur B. Rubinstein
1983	Class	Elmer Bernstein	Elmer Bernstein	Peter Bernstein
1983	The Right Stuff	Bill Conti	Bill Conti	Angela Morley & Richard Hazard
1983	Gorky Park	James Horner	James Horner	Greig McRitchie
1983	Trading Places	Elmer Bernstein	Elmer Bernstein	Peter Bernstein
1983	Bad Boys	Bill Conti	Bill Conti	Peter Myers, Loree Myers & Bill Conti
1983	Spacehunter: Adventures in the Forbidden Zone	Elmer Bernstein	Elmer Bernstein	Peter Bernstein
1984	The Lonely Guy	Jerry Goldsmith	Jerry Goldsmith & Arthur Morton	Arthur Morton & Jerry Goldsmith
1984	Indiana Jones and the Temple of Doom	John Williams	John Williams	Herbert W. Spencer & Alexander Courage
1984	The Pope of Greenwich Village	Dave Grusin	Dave Grusin	
1984	Ghostbusters	Elmer Bernstein	Elmer Bernstein	Peter Bernstein & David Spear
1984	Gremlins	Jerry Goldsmith	Jerry Goldsmith	Arthur Morton & Alexander Courage
1984	Red Dawn	Basil Poledouris	Basil Poledouris	Jack Smalley, Greig McRichie & Steven Scott Smalley
1984	The Last Starfighter	Craig Safan	Craig Safan	Alf Clausen & Joel Rosenbaum
1984	The Karate Kid	Bill Conti	Bill Conti	Richard Hazard & Angela Morley
1984	Tank	Lalo Schifrin	Lalo Schifrin	
1984	Body Double	Pino Donaggio	Natale Massara	Pino Donaggio
1984	Falling in Love	Dave Grusin	Dave Grusin	
1985	Cocoon	James Horner	James Horner	Billy May, Herbert W. Spencer and Greig McRitchie
1985	Explorers	Jerry Goldsmith	Jerry Goldsmith	Arthur Morton
1985	Back to the Future	Alan Silvestri	Alan Silvestri	James Campbell
1985	The Journey of Natty Gann	James Horner	James Horner	Greig McRitchie
1985	The Mean Season	Lalo Schifrin	Lalo Schifrin	Lalo Schifrin
1985	The Goonies	Dave Grusin	Dave Grusin	Greig McRitchie & Brad Warnaar
1986	The Karate Kid Part II	Bill Conti	Bill Conti	Jack Eskew
1986	Poltergeist II: The Other Side	Jerry Goldsmith	Jerry Goldsmith	Arthur Morton
1986	SpaceCamp	John Williams	John Williams	Herbert W. Spencer
1987	Predator	Alan Silvestri	Alan Silvestri	James Campbell
1987	Innerspace	Jerry Goldsmith	Jerry Goldsmith	Arthur Morton
1987	The Monster Squad	Bruce Broughton	Bruce Broughton	Mark McKenzie
1987	Lethal Weapon	Michael Kamen & Eric Clapton	Michael Kamen	William Ross, Chris Boardman, and Bruce Babcock
1987	Broadcast News	Bill Conti	Bill Conti	Jack Eskew
1987	Adventures in Babysitting	Michael Kamen	Michael Kamen	Michael Kamen & Bruce Babcock
1988	Die Hard	Michael Kamen	Michael Kamen	Michael Kamen & Chris Boardman
1988	Messenger of Death	Robert O. Ragland	Robert O. Ragland	Robert O. Ragland
1988	Betrayed	Bill Conti	Bill Conti	Jack Eskew
1988	Cocoon: The Return	James Horner	James Horner	James Horner & Greig McRitchie
1988	The Dead Pool	Lalo Schifrin	Lalo Schifrin	Lalo Schifrin
1988	Cohen and Tate	Bill Conti	Bill Conti	Jack Eskew & Bruce Healey
1988	Off Limits	James Newton Howard	Marty Paich	Brad Dechter
1989	Bill & Ted's Excellent Adventure	David Newman	David Newman	David Newman, Jeff Atmajian, and Mark McKenzie
1989	Lock Up	Bill Conti	Bill Conti	Jack Eskew
1989	The Abyss	Alan Silvestri	Alan Silvestri	James Campbell
1989	Indiana Jones and the Last Crusade	John Williams	John Williams	Herbert W. Spencer, John Neufield & Alexander Courage
1989	Star Trek V: The Final Frontier	Jerry Goldsmith	Jerry Goldsmith	Arthur Morton
1989	Lethal Weapon 2	Michael Kamen, Eric Clapton, & David Sanborn	Michael Kamen	Chris Boardman, Bruce Babcock, and Michael Kamen
1989	The Package	James Newton Howard	Marty Paich	Albert Woodbury, Brad Dechter, Bruce Babcock, Chris Boardman & Marty Paich
1989	Ghostbusters II	Randy Edelman	Randy Edelman	Greig McRitchie & Steven Scott Smalley
1989	Always	John Williams	John Williams	John Neufeld, Alexander Courage & Herbert W. Spencer
1989	Back to the Future Part II	Alan Silvestri	Alan Silvestri	James Campbell & Alan Silvestri
1990	Stanley & Iris	John Williams	John Williams	Herbert W. Spencer & John Neufield
1990	Joe Versus the Volcano	Georges Delerue	Georges Delerue	Georges Delerue
1990	Quigley Down Under	Basil Poledouris	Basil Poledouris	Greig McRitchie & Mark McKenzie
1990	Child's Play 2	Graeme Revell	Shirley Walker	Bruce Fowler & Shirley Walker
1990	Dances with Wolves	John Barry	John Barry	Greig McRitchie & Mark McKenzie
1990	Gremlins 2: The New Batch	Jerry Goldsmith	Jerry Goldsmith	Arthur Morton
1990	The Hunt for Red October	Basil Poledouris	Basil Poledouris	Greig McRitchie, Richard Stone & Basil Poledouris
1990	Home Alone	John Williams	John Williams	John Neufeld, Alexander Courage, Herbert W. Spencer, Angela Morley & Steve Bartek
1990	Kindergarten Cop	Randy Edelman	Randy Edelman	Greig McRitchie
1990	The Russia House	Jerry Goldsmith	Jerry Goldsmith	Arthur Morton
1991	Hook	John Williams	John Williams	Alexander Courage, Angela Morley & John Neufield
1991	Necessary Roughness	Bill Conti	Bill Conti	Jack Eskew
1991	Robin Hood: Prince of Thieves	Michael Kamen	Michael Kamen	Albert Olson, Beth Lee, Brad Warnaar, Bruce Babcock, Chris Boardman, Don Davis, Elliot Kaplan, Harvey C. Cohen, Jack Hayes, Jonathan Sacks, Lolita Ritmanis, Mark Watters, Michael Kamen, Patrick Russ, Richard Davis & William Ross
1991	Company Business	Michael Kamen	Michael Kamen	Michael Kamen
1991	An American Tail: Fievel Goes West	James Horner	James Horner	John Neufeld; Gregg McRitchie
1992	Love Field	Jerry Goldsmith	Jerry Goldsmith	Alexander Courage
1992	Wind	Basil Poledouris	Basil Poledouris	Greig McRitchie & Basil Poledouris
1992	Memoirs of an Invisible Man	Shirley Walker	Shirley Walker	Larry Rench, Bruce Fowler & Lisa Bloom
1992	The Babe	Elmer Bernstein	Elmer Bernstein	Emilie Bernstein
1992	Beethoven	Randy Edelman	Randy Edelman	Greig McRitchie
1992	Lethal Weapon 3	Michael Kamen, Eric Clapton, & David Sanborn	Michael Kamen	Lolita Ritmanis, Bruce Babcock, and Michael Kamen
1992	Death Becomes Her	Alan Silvestri	Alan Silvestri	William Ross
1992	Diggstown	James Newton Howard	James Newton Howard	Brad Dechter & James Newton Howard
1992	Jennifer 8	Christopher Young	William Ross	Pete Anthony, Patrick Russ & Christopher Young
1992	Alien 3	Elliot Goldenthal	Jonathan Sheffer	Elliot Goldenthal
1992	Home Alone 2: Lost in New York	John Williams	John Williams	John Neufeld, Angela Morley, Alexander Courage & Dennis Dreith
1992	Glengarry Glen Ross	James Newton Howard	James Newton Howard	Brad Dechter & James Newton Howard
1993	Jack the Bear	James Horner	James Horner	Joel Rosenbaum & James Horner
1993	The Fugitive	James Newton Howard	Marty Paich	James Newton Howard, Brad Dechter & Chris Boardman
1993	The Age of Innocence	Elmer Bernstein	Elmer Bernstein	Emilie A. Bernstein
1993	Judgment Night	Alan Silvestri	Alan Silvestri	William Ross
1993	Blood In Blood Out	Bill Conti	Bill Conti	Jack Eskew
1993	Rudy	Jerry Goldsmith	Jerry Goldsmith	Arthur Morton & Alexander Courage
1993	RoboCop 3	Basil Poledouris	Basil Poledouris	Greig McRitchie & Mark McKenzie
1993	Alive	James Newton Howard	Marty Paich	Brad Dechter, Chris Boardman, James Newton Howard & Mark McKenzie
1993	Jurassic Park	John Williams	John Williams	Alexander Courage, Conrad Pope, John Neufeld, Dennis Dreith, & Aimee Vereecke
1993	Free Willy	Basil Poledouris	Basil Poledouris	Greig McRitchie
1993	Dave	James Newton Howard	Marty Paich	James Newton Howard, Brad Dechter, Frank Bennett & Chris Boardman
1993	Schindler's List	John Williams	John Williams	John Neufeld & Angela Morley
1993	The Good Son	Elmer Bernstein	Elmer Bernstein	Emilie A. Bernstein & Patrick Russ
1993	Last Action Hero	Michael Kamen	Michael Kamen	Brad Warnaar, Chris Boardman, Danny Troob, Don Davis, Harvey C. Cohen, Jack Hayes, Jonathan Sacks, Larry Rench, Lolita Ritmanis, Michael Kamen, Michael McCuistion, Randy Kerber & William Ross
1993	Batman: Mask of the Phantasm	Shirley Walker	Shirley Walker	Harvey R. Cohen, Ian Walker, Larry Rench, Lolita Ritmanis, Michael McCuistion & Peter Tomashek
1994	Forrest Gump	Alan Silvestri	Alan Silvestri	William Ross
1994	Wyatt Earp	James Newton Howard	Marty Paich	James Newton Howard, Brad Dechter& Chris Boardman
1994	The Shawshank Redemption	Thomas Newman	Thomas Newman	Thomas Pasatieri
1994	The River Wild	Jerry Goldsmith	Jerry Goldsmith	Arthur Morton & Alexander Courage
1994	Miracle on 34th Street	Bruce Broughton	Bruce Broughton	Bruce Broughton & William Ross
1995	Dolores Claiborne	Danny Elfman	Richard Stone	Steve Bartek
1995	Bad Boys	Mark Mancina	Nick Glennie-Smith	Bruce Fowler & Yvonne S. Moriarty
1995	Under Siege 2: Dark Territory	Basil Poledouris	Basil Poledouris	Greig McRitchie & Lolita Ritmanis
1995	Casper	James Horner	James Horner	James Horner, Art Kempel, Don Davis & Greig McRitchie
1995	Apollo 13	James Horner	James Horner	James Horner, Don Davis & Steven Bramson
1995	Species	Christopher Young	Pete Anthony	Pete Anthony & Christopher Young
1995	Waterworld	James Newton Howard	Artie Kane	James Newton Howard, Brad Dechter, Jeff Atmajian, Robert Elhai & Chris Boardman
1995	Free Willy 2: The Adventure Home	Basil Poledouris	Basil Poledouris & Shirley Walker	Greig McRichie & Lolita Ritmantis
1995	Sabrina	John Williams	John Williams	Conrad Pope & John Neufield
1995	Virtuosity	Christopher Young	Pete Anthony	Pete Anthony, Patrick Russ, & Christopher Young
1995	Nixon	John Williams	John Williams	John Neufield
1995	Devil in a Blue Dress	Elmer Bernstein	Elmer Bernstein	Emilie A. Bernstein
1996	Executive Decision	Jerry Goldsmith	Jerry Goldsmith	Alexander Courage
1996	Mission: Impossible	Danny Elfman	Artie Kane	Steve Bartek & Mark McKenzie
1996	Chain Reaction	Jerry Goldsmith	Jerry Goldsmith	Arthur Morton & Alexander Courage
1996	Jingle All the Way	David Newman	David Newman	Daniel Humuy, Xandy Janko & David Newman
1996	Mars Attacks!	Danny Elfman	Artie Kane	Steve Bartek, Edgardo Simon & Mark McKenzie
1996	Mulholland Falls	Dave Grusin	Dave Grusin	Brad Dechter & Dave Grusin
1996	Escape from L.A.	Shirley Walker & John Carpenter	Shirley Walker	Kristopher Carter, Larry Rench, Lolita Ritmanis, Michael McCuistion & Shirley Walker
1997	Rosewood	John Williams	John Williams	John Neufeld & Conrad Pope
1997	Volcano	Alan Silvestri	Alan Silvestri	William Ross, Mark McKenzie & Conrad Pope
1997	Breakdown	Basil Poledouris	Basil Poledouris	Steven Scott Smalley, Greig McRitchie, & Lolita Ritmanis
1997	The Lost World: Jurassic Park	John Williams	John Williams	Conrad Pope, John Neufeld, Dennis Dreith, Vince Bartold, and Marian Mayer
1997	Air Force One	Jerry Goldsmith	Jerry Goldsmith	Alexander Courage & Dave Slonaker
1997	L.A. Confidential	Jerry Goldsmith	Jerry Goldsmith	Arthur Morton & Alexander Courage
1997	Turbulance	Shirley Walker	Shirley Walker	David Russell, Ira Hearshen, Larry Rench, Lolita Ritmanis, Michael McCuistion & Kristopher Carter
1997	Mad City	Thomas Newman	Thomas Newman	Thomas Pasatieri
1997	Starship Troopers	Basil Poledouris	Basil Poledouris	Greig McRitchie & Steven Scott Smalley
1997	Rosewood	John Williams	John Williams	John Neufeld & Conrad Pope
1997	Titanic	James Horner	James Horner & William Ross	James Horner, William Ross, Don Davis, and Chris Boardman
1998	Blade	Mark Isham	Kenneth Kugler	Kenneth Kugler
1998	Deep Impact	James Horner	James Horner	James Horner & J.A.C. Redford
1998	Bride of Chucky	Graeme Revell	Graeme Revell	Tim Simonec
1998	Rush Hour	Lalo Schifrin	Lalo Schifrin	
1999	The Haunting	Jerry Goldsmith	Jerry Goldsmith	Alexander Courage
1999	The Matrix	Don Davis	Don Davis	Don Davis
1999	Random Hearts	Dave Grusin	Dave Grusin	
2000	The Perfect Storm	James Horner	James Horner	James Horner & J.A.C. Redford
2000	The Patriot	John Williams	John Williams	Conrad Pope
2000	Proof of Life	Danny Elfman	Pete Anthony	Steve Bartek, Edgardo Simone, Mark McKenzie
2000	The Emperor's New Groove	John Debney	John Debney	Brad Dechter, Chris Klatman, Don Nemitz & Frank Bennett
2000	The Flintstones in Viva Rock Vegas	David Newman	David Newman	
2000	How the Grinch Stole Christmas	James Horner	James Horner	J.A.C. Redford & Randy Kerber
2000	The Replacements	John Debney	John Debney	Brad Dechter & Frank Bennett
2001	Along Came a Spider	Jerry Goldsmith	Jerry Goldsmith	Mark McKenzie
2001	Evolution	John Powell	Gavin Greenaway	Bruce Fowler; Suzette Moriarty; Ladd McIntosh; Walter Fowler; Elizabeth Finch
2001	Cats & Dogs	John Debney	Pete Anthony	John Debney, Brad Dechter & Pete Anthony
2001	The Princess Diaries	John Debney	John Debney	Brad Dechter
2001	Rush Hour 2	Lalo Schifrin	Lalo Schifrin	Lalo Schifrin & Ira Hearshen
2001	Bubble Boy	John Ottman	Damon Intrabartolo	John Ottman & Damon Intrabartolo
2001	Jay and Silent Bob Strike Back	James L. Venable	Ardell Hake	Ardell Hake
2001	The Glass House	Christopher Young	Pete Anthony	
2001	Don't Say a Word	Mark Isham		
2001	Joy Ride	Marco Beltrami	Marco Beltrami & Pete Anthony	
2001	Domestic Disturbance	Mark Mancina	Don Harper	
2001	The One	Trevor Rabin	Gordon Goodwin	
2001	Black Knight	Randy Edelman	Randy Edelman	Ralph Ferraro
2001	Jurassic Park III	Don Davis	Don Davis	
2001	Monsters, Inc.	Randy Newman	Randy Newman	
2001	The Affair of the Necklace	David Newman	David Newman	
2001	Jimmy Neutron: Boy Genius	John Debney	Pete Anthony	
2001	I Am Sam	John Powell		
2002	Collateral Damage	Graeme Revell	Tim Simonec; Blake Neely	Tim Simonec
2002	Dragonfly	John Debney	John Debney	John Debney
2002	Panic Room	Howard Shore		
2002	Ice Age	David Newman		
2002	Blade II	Marco Beltrami	Pete Anthony	Pete Anthony
2002	The Scorpion King	John Debney	Pete Anthony & John Debney	
2002	The Salton Sea	Thomas Newman		
2002	Spider-Man	Danny Elfman	Pete Anthony	Steve Bartek
2002	Unfaithful	Jan A. P. Kaczmarek	Michael Nowak	Jan A. P. Kaczmarek
2002	Enough	David Arnold	Nicholas Dodd	Nicholas Dodd
2002	The Bourne Identity	John Powell	Pete Anthony	Bruce Fowler & Suzette Moriarty
2002	Passionada	Harry Gregson-Williams	Harry Gregson-Williams	
2002	Pumpkin	John Ottman	Damon Intrabartolo	John Ottman & Damon Intrabartolo
2002	Signs	James Newton Howard	Pete Anthony	Pete Anthony
2002	xXx	Randy Edelman	Randy Edelman	Randy Edelman & Ralph Ferraro
2002	The Tuxedo	Christophe Beck; John Debney	John Debney; Pete Anthony	Kevin Kliesch
2002	White Oleander	Thomas Newman		
2002	Far from Heaven	Elmer Bernstein	Elmer Bernstein	Emilie A. Bernstein
2002	The Emperor's Club	James Newton Howard	Pete Anthony	Brad Dechter
2002	Star Trek: Nemesis	Jerry Goldsmith	Jerry Goldsmith	Conrad Pope & Mark McKenzie
2002	Catch Me If You Can	John Williams	John Williams	Conrad Pope & John Neufield
2003	Daredevil	Graeme Revell	Tim Simonec	Tim Simonec
2003	Tears of the Sun	Hans Zimmer	Bruce Fowler	Bruce Fowler
2003	Dreamcatcher	James Newton Howard	Pete Anthony	Pete Anthony, Jeff Atmajian, Brad Dechter & James Newton Howard
2003	Identity	Alan Silvestri	Alan Silvestri	Alan Silvestri
2003	Bruce Almighty	John Debney	Pete Anthony	Pete Anthony
2003	The Italian Job	John Powell	Pete Anthony	
2003	Terminator 3: Rise of the Machines	Marco Beltrami	Pete Anthony	Pete Anthony
2003	Pirates of the Caribbean: The Curse of the Black Pearl	Klaus Badelt	Blake Neely	Bruce Fowler
2003	Gigli	John Powell		
2003	Jeepers Creepers 2	Bennett Salvay		
2003	Matchstick Men	Hans Zimmer	Bruce Fowler	Bruce Fowler, Walt Fowler & Yvonne S. Moriarty
2003	The Rundown	Harry Gregson-Williams	Harry Gregson-Williams	Bruce Fowler
2003	Out of Time	Graeme Revell	Graeme Revell	Tim Simonec
2003	Scary Movie 3	James L. Venable	Dell Hake	Dell Hake
2003	Looney Tunes: Back in Action	Jerry Goldsmith	Jerry Goldsmith	Pete Anthony, Brad Dechter & Mark McKenzie
2003	Gothika	John Ottman	Damon Intrabartolo	John Ottman; Damon Intrabartolo
2003	Timeline	Jerry Goldsmith (Rejected); Brian Tyler	Jerry Goldsmith (Rejected); Brian Tyler	Mark McKenzie (Rejected); Robert Elhai; Dana Niu; Brian Tyler
2003	The Last Samurai	Hans Zimmer	Blake Neely	
2003	House of Sand and Fog	James Horner	James Horner	
2003	Paycheck	John Powell	Gavin Greenaway	Bruce Fowler; Suzette Moriarty; Todd Mcintosh; Walter Fowler; Elizabeth Finch
2003	Peter Pan	James Newton Howard		
2004	Miracle	Mark Isham		
2004	Hellboy	Marco Beltrami	Pete Anthony	Pete Anthony
2004	Bobby Jones: Stroke of Genius	James Horner		
2004	The Day After Tomorrow	Harald Kloser	Blake Neely	
2004	The Chronicles of Riddick	Graeme Revell		
2004	The Terminal	John Williams	John Williams	
2004	Spider-Man 2	Danny Elfman	Pete Anthony	Steve Bartek
2004	The Notebook	Aaron Zigman		
2004	I, Robot	Marco Beltrami	Marco Beltrami & Pete Anthony	Pete Anthony
2004	The Bourne Supremacy	John Powell	Pete Anthony	
2004	The Village	James Newton Howard		
2004	Surviving Christmas	Randy Edelman		
2004	Million Dollar Baby	Clint Eastwood		
2004	Flight of the Phoenix	Marco Beltrami		
2004	Meet the Fockers	Randy Newman		
2005	Elektra	Christophe Beck		
2005	Robots	John Powell	Pete Anthony	
2005	Sin City	Robert Rodriguez; John Debney; Graeme Revell	John Debney; Bruce Babcock	Brad Dechter; George Oldziey; Mike Watts; Frank Bennett; Bruce Babcock
2005	Mr. & Mrs. Smith	John Powell	Pete Anthony & Mark Watters	Brad Dechter, Bruce Fowler & Randy Kerber
2005	The Interpreter	James Newton Howard		
2005	Dark Water	Angelo Badalamenti		
2005	The Island	Steve Jablonsky		
2005	Four Brothers	David Arnold		
2005	The Skeleton Key	Edward Shearmur		
2005	Serenity	David Newman		
2005	Flightplan	James Horner	James Horner	
2005	The Greatest Game Ever Played	Brian Tyler		
2005	Zathura: A Space Adventure	John Debney	John Debney	
2005	Syriana	Alexandre Desplat		
2005	King Kong	James Newton Howard	Pete Anthony	Pete Anthony
2005	The Family Stone	Michael Giacchino		
2005	Fun with Dick and Jane	Theodore Shapiro	Pete Anthony	
2006	Annapolis	Brian Tyler		
2006	Firewall	Alexandre Desplat	Pete Anthony	
2006	Final Destination 3	Shirley Walker	Shirley Walker	Shirley Walker, Ian Walker & Larry Rench
2006	The Pink Panther	Christophe Beck	Pete Anthony	Kevin Kliesch
2006	Freedomland	James Newton Howard		
2006	Inside Man	Terence Blanchard	Terence Blanchard	Terence Blanchard & Howard Drossin
2006	Ice Age: The Meltdown	John Powell	Pete Anthony	
2006	The Sentinel	Christophe Beck	Pete Anthony	Kevin Kliesch
2006	Mission: Impossible III	Michael Giacchino	Tim Simonec	
2006	Monster House	Douglas Pipes	Bruce Babcock	
2006	X-Men: The Last Stand	John Powell	Pete Anthony	Kevin Kliesch
2006	The Fast and the Furious: Tokyo Drift	Brian Tyler	Brian Tyler	
2006	Lady in the Water	James Newton Howard	Pete Anthony	Brad Dechter
2006	The Ant Bully	John Debney	John Debney	
2006	World Trade Center	Craig Armstrong	Pete Anthony	
2006	Snakes on a Plane	Trevor Rabin		
2006	All the King's Men	James Horner	James Horner	
2006	The Prestige	Hans Zimmer		
2006	The Holiday	Hans Zimmer	Rupert Gregson-Williams	Suzette Moriarty & Walt Fowler
2006	Night at the Museum	Alan Silvestri	Alan Silvestri	
2007	Because I Said So	David Kitay		
2007	Partition	Brian Tyler	Brian Tyler	
2007	Disturbia	Geoff Zanelli		
2007	Evan Almighty	John Debney	John Debney	Brad Dechter
2007	Live Free or Die Hard	Marco Beltrami	Pete Anthony	Pete Anthony
2007	Transformers	Steve Jablonsky	Nick Glennie-Smith	
2007	Rush Hour 3	Lalo Schifrin	Lalo Schifrin	Ira Hearshen & Ruy Folguera
2007	The Invasion	John Ottman		
2007	Michael Clayton	James Newton Howard	Blake Neely	
2007	American Gangster	Marc Streitenfeld		
2007	Lions for Lambs	Mark Isham		
2007	Beowulf	Alan Silvestri	Alan Silvestri	
2007	August Rush	Mark Mancina		
2007	I Am Legend	James Newton Howard		
2007	Charlie Wilson's War	James Newton Howard	Pete Anthony	Pete Anthony
2007	Aliens vs. Predator: Requiem	Brian Tyler	Brian Tyler	
2007	The Bucket List	Marc Shaiman	Pete Anthony	
2008	Vantage Point	Atli Örvarsson	Nick Glennie-Smith	
2008	Horton Hears a Who!	John Powell	Pete Anthony	Kevin Kliesch
2008	Stop-Loss	John Powell		
2008	Nim's Island	Patrick Doyle	James Shearman	Patrick Doyle; James Sherman; Geoff Alexander; Dwight Mikkelsen
2008	Standard Operating Procedure	Danny Elfman		
2008	Speed Racer	Michael Giacchino	Tim Simonec	Tim Simonec
2008	The Happening	James Newton Howard	Pete Anthony	Jeff Atmajian, Brad Dechter, Jon Kull
2008	Get Smart	Trevor Rabin		
2008	Hancock	John Powell	Pete Anthony, Blake Neely, Don Harper	Kevin Kliesch
2008	Pineapple Express	Graeme Revell		
2008	Tropic Thunder	Theodore Shapiro	Pete Anthony	Pete Anthony
2008	The Day the Earth Stood Still	Tyler Bates		
2008	Bolt	John Powell	Pete Anthony	
2008	The Tale of Despereaux	William Ross		William Ross
2008	Meet Dave	John Debney	John Debney	Frank Bennett
2008	The Spirit	David Newman	David Newman	
2009	He's Just Not That Into You	Cliff Eidelman		
2009	Watchmen	Tyler Bates		
2009	Dragonball: Evolution	Brian Tyler		
2009	Duplicity	James Newton Howard	Pete Anthony	Brad Detchter, Jeff Atmajian & James Newton Howard
2009	X-Men Origins: Wolverine	Harry Gregson-Williams	Harry Gregson-Williams	Ladd McIntosh
2009	Star Trek	Michael Giacchino	Tim Simonec	Tim Simonec, Michael Giacchino, Chris Tilton, Peter Boyer, Larry Kenton, Richard Bronskill & Jack Hayes
2009	Angels & Demons	Hans Zimmer	Nick Glennie-Smith	
2009	Night at the Museum: Battle of the Smithsonian	Alan Silvestri	Alan Silvestri	
2009	Land of the Lost	Michael Giacchino	Tim Simonec	
2009	Ice Age: Dawn of the Dinosaurs	John Powell	Pete Anthony	Pete Anthony & Kevin Kliesch
2009	Aliens in the Attic	John Debney		
2009	G.I. Joe: The Rise of Cobra	Alan Silvestri		
2009	The Time Traveler's Wife	Mychael Danna		
2009	All About Steve	Christophe Beck		Kevin Kliesch
2009	A Christmas Carol	Alan Silvestri	Alan Silvestri	
2010	Valentine's Day	John Debney		
2010	In My Sleep	Conrad Pope		
2010	A Nighrmare on Elm Street	Steve Jablonsky	Nick Glennie-Smith	
2010	The A-Team	Alan Silvestri		
2010	Predators	John Debney	Pete Anthony	
2010	Cats & Dogs: The Revenge of Kitty Galore	Christopher Lennertz		
2010	Charlie St. Cloud	Rolfe Kent		
2010	The Tourist	James Newton Howard	Pete Anthony	Pete Anthony
2010	Little Fockers	Stephen Trask	Pete Anthony	
2011	I Am Number Four	Trevor Rabin		
2011	Battle: Los Angeles	Brian Tyler	Brian Tyler	
2011	Hop	Christopher Lennertz		
2011	Your Highness	Steve Jablonsky	Nick Glennie-Smith	
2011	Rio	John Powell	Pete Anthony	
2011	Fast Five	Brian Tyler		
2011	Super 8	Michael Giacchino	Tim Simonec	Tim Simonec
2011	Green Lantern	James Newton Howard	Pete Anthony	Pete Anthony
2011	Mr. Popper's Penguins	Rolfe Kent		
2011	Monte Carlo	Michael Giacchino	Tim Simonec	
2011	Cowboys & Aliens	Harry Gregson-Williams		
2011	Rise of the Planet of the Apes	Patrick Doyle	James Shearman	James Shearman
2011	The Help	Thomas Newman		J. A. C. Redford
2011	Fright Night	Ramin Djawadi		
2011	Real Steel	Danny Elfman	Pete Anthony	
2011	The Thing	Marco Beltrami	Pete Anthony	
2011	Mission: Impossible – Ghost Protocol	Michael Giacchino	Tim Simonec	
2012	Big Miracle	Cliff Eidelman	Cliff Eidelman	Cliff Eidelman, Larry Rench, Patrick Russ & Penka Kouneva
2012	The Lorax	John Powell	Pete Anthony	Pete Anthony
2012	Battleship	Steve Jablonsky	Nick Glennie-Smith	Bruce Fowler, Jennifer Hammond, Kevin Kaska, Rick Giovinazzo, Walter Fowler
2012	Ice Age: Continental Drift	John Powell	Pete Anthony	Pete Anthony
2012	The Bourne Legacy	James Newton Howard		
2012	Trouble with the Curve	Marco Beltrami	Pete Anthony	Pete Anthony
2012	A Thousand Words	John Debney	John Debney	Brad Dechter, Christopher Lord, Frank Bennett, Kevin Kaska & Michael Watts
2013	Gangster Squad	Steve Jablonsky	Nick Glennie-Smith	
2013	G.I. Joe: Retaliation	Henry Jackman	Nick Glennie-Smith	
2013	After Earth	James Newton Howard	Pete Anthony	Pete Anthony
2013	White House Down	Harald Kloser Thomas Wander		
2013	Pacific Rim	Ramin Djawadi		
2013	The Smurfs 2	Heitor Pereira		
2013	Kick-Ass 2	Henry Jackman & Matthew Margeson		
2013	Romeo & Juliet	Abel Korzeniowski		
2014	Ride Along	Christopher Lennertz		
2014	Winter's Tale	Hans Zimmer & Rupert Gregson-Williams	Nick Glennie-Smith	
2014	300: Rise of an Empire	Junkie XL		
2014	Dawn of the Planet of the Apes	Michael Giacchino	Tim Simonec	
2014	Rio 2	John Powell		Nicholas Pike
2014	Godzilla	Alexandre Desplat	Alexandre Desplat	
2014	The Equalizer	Harry Gregson-Williams		
2014	The Homesman	Marco Beltrami		Pete Anthony
2015	Jupiter Ascending	Michael Giacchino		
2015	The SpongeBob Movie: Sponge Out of Water	John Debney	John Debney	John Debney
2015	Pixels	Henry Jackman	Nick Glennie-Smith	
2015	Star Wars: The Force Awakens	John Williams	John Williams & William Ross	John Williams, William Ross, & Gustavo Dudamel
2015	Scouts Guide to the Zombie Apocalypse	Matthew Margeson		
2016	Ice Age: Collision Course	John Debney	John Debney	John Debney & Pete Anthony
2016	Lights Out	Benjamin Wallfisch		
2016	Star Trek Beyond	Michael Giacchino	Tim Simonec	
2016	Suicide Squad	Steven Price	Pete Anthony	
2017	xXx: Return of Xander Cage	Brian Tyler		
2017	Logan	Marco Beltrami	Pete Anthony	Pete Anthony
2017	Star Wars: The Last Jedi	John Williams	John Williams & William Ross	John Williams & William Ross
2017	War for the Planet of the Apes	Michael Giacchino	Marshall Bowen & Tim Simonec	
2017	Annabelle: Creation	Benjamin Wallfisch		
2019	Star Wars: The Rise of Skywalker	John Williams	John Williams	John Williams & William Ross
2020	Tenet	Ludwig Göransson	Anthony Parnther	
2021	Ghostbusters: Afterlife	Rob Simonsen	Anthony Parnther	
2021	Spider-Man: No Way Home	Michael Giacchino	Marshall Bowen	
2022	Turning Red	Ludwig Göransson	Anthony Parnther	
2025	The Day the Earth Blew Up: A Looney Tunes Movie	Joshua Moshier	Anthony Parnther; Joshua Moshier	Joshua Moshier; Dan Brown; Cara Batema

=== Television ===
Years	Title	Composer	Seasons
2004–2010	Lost	Michael Giacchino	4, 5
2007–2009	Pushing Daisies	James Dooley	2
2008–2013	Fringe	Michael Giacchino	1, 2, 3, 4, 5
2011–2018	Once Upon a Time	Mark Isham	2
2013–2018	House of Cards	Jeff Beal	2, 5
2014–2016	Penny Dreadful	Abel Korzeniowski	2, 3
2019	Green Eggs and Ham	David Newman	1
2020-2024	Star Trek: Lower Decks	Chris Westlake	1–5
