= The Art of Star Wars =

Art based on the Star Wars movies

- Cover of the 1st edition (1979)
- Editor: Carol Titelman, Valerie Hoffman
- Language: English
- Subject: Production design and artwork of Star Wars films
- Publisher: Ballantine Books, LucasBooks, DelRey, Harry N. Abrams
- Publication date: November 1979
- Publication place: USA
- Media type: Hardcover
- ISBN: 0345282736 first edition

The Art of Star Wars is a series of books by various editors featuring concept art from the Star Wars motion picture saga. The books mainly feature artwork accompanied by a short explanation of the scene and the artist's ideas, but also script notes, posters and other information. The first books were published by Ballantine Books, a subsidiary of Random House, with later editions appearing under the DelRey and LucasBooks imprints. Later titles were published by Harry N. Abrams.

The Art of Star Wars was also the title of an exhibition of Star Wars artwork, props, and costumes mounted by Lucasfilm at the Yerba Buena Center for the Arts in San Francisco in 1995. The exhibition was subsequently expanded to various international venues from 2000 to 2001, including the Barbican Art Gallery in London and the Helsinki City Art Museum.

== Content ==
Carol Titelman's first volume, originally entitled The Art of Star Wars, was published in 1979 amid a popular trend for behind-the-scenes, "making-of" media products (such as The Making of Star Wars documentary). The book presents a range of pre-production concept art, storyboards, and publicity shots alongside Lucas's screenplay. It has been noted as a rich record of the previsualization behind the 1977 movie that gives the reader an insight into the "possibilities that might have been" in the final production design, and that challenges the "authorial singularity and originality" that normally surrounds the works of a Hollywood auteur. The first volume has been called the definitive work on the development of the cinematographic art of Star Wars, a body of creative works that heavily influenced later films.

The first book presents some of the earliest concept sketches of a number of now-familiar characters of the Star Wars universe, including early impressions of the helmet of Darth Vader, the droids C-3PO and R2-D2, Imperial stormtroopers, and the alien clientele of the Mos Eisley Cantina on the planet Tatooine. The concept sketches and matte paintings of Ralph McQuarrie feature heavily, alongside sketches by Joe Johnston, set design drawings by John Barry, costume design sketches by John Mollo, storyboards by Alex Tavoularis and photographs by Bob Seidemann and John Jay. McQuarrie's work was considered highly influential in the production of the first three Star Wars movies; Journalist Jonathan Jones wrote of McQuarrie: "Looking at his [McQuarrie's] paintings, you can recognise that the appeal of this art is similar to that of 19th century Orientalist paintings of harems and sandy vistas." Section one of the book, accompanied by illustrations, features "the script" and is introduced by the title page text: "Star Wars_{↵} Episode_{↵} IV_{↵} A New Hope_{↵} from the_{↵} Journal of the Whills_{↵} by_{↵} George Lucas_{↵} Revised Fourth Draft_{↵} January 15, 1976_{↵} Lucasfilm Ltd." Later book sections, from pages 138 to 175, feature the artwork of film posters by Tom Jung, Dan Goozee, Drew Struzan, John Berkey, Tom Chantrell, the Hildebrandt Brothers, Howard Chaykin, Wojtek Siudmak and Ralph McQuarrie; and the art of spin-off products such as the Marvel Comics series, Star Wars-themed cartoons such as Berry's World and Stan Mack's Real Life Funnies; and fan art.

Two volumes were subsequently published to accompany the sequel films; The Art of the Empire Strikes Back, edited by Deborah Call, was published in 1980; and The Art of Return of the Jedi was published in 1983.

In 2000, the Star Wars prequel trilogy began with the release of Star Wars: Episode I – The Phantom Menace, and corresponding books in The Art of Star Wars series were published. As in previous volumes, these books contain paintings, sketches, mock-ups, models and photos of scenes, buildings, costumes, characters, spacecraft and creatures, along with digitally mastered pictures. The books chart the progress of production from original gouache drawings to the three-dimensional models of spaceships. McQuarrie had retired by this stage, and the production artwork of Doug Chiang features heavily in these books. Extracts from the Episode I book were published in a 48-page booklet accompanying a US "collectors' edition" videotape of The Phantom Menace in 2000.

The Art of Star Wars, Episode III - Revenge of the Sith, published in 2005, features a foreword by director George Lucas, and presents the early concept art for significant scenes in Episode III, in particular the final lightsaber duel of Obi-Wan Kenobi and Anakin Skywalker on the hellish lava planet of Mustafar, and the medical chamber where Darth Vader is dressed in his trademark armour.

Following the acquisition of Lucasfilm by The Walt Disney Company in 2012, a sequel trilogy went into production. The Art of Star Wars: The Force Awakens, published in 2015, features the work of concept artists Iain McCaig and Craig Alzmann, production designer Rick Carter and Doug Chiang. The book contains early concept art tracing the early development of the character of Kylo Ren, and also reveals preliminary sketches that illustrate a proposed appearance of Anakin Skywalker as a malevolent "Force ghost".

== Reprints ==
Following the theatrical release of The Empire Strikes Back in 1980, and the re-release of the original Star Wars film in 1981, the film series adopted an episodic naming convention in the opening crawl. From 1994, reprinted editions of the first three books also adopted episode titles — The Art of Star Wars Episode IV: A New Hope, and so on. Revised editions of the first three books were published in 1997, with changes and new material added to reflect the additional special effects used in the Special Edition theatrical releases.

== The books ==
Book	Relates to film
Titelman, Carol; Hoffman, Valerie, eds. (1979). The Art of Star Wars (1st ed.). New York: Ballantine Books. ISBN 0345282736. Reprinted 1994 ISBN 9781852865832	Star Wars: Episode IV – A New Hope
Bulluck, Vic; Hoffman, Valerie (1980). Call, Deborah (ed.). The Art of The Empire Strikes Back (1st ed.). New York: Ballantine Books. ISBN 9780345293350. Reprinted 1994 ISBN 9780345392039	Star Wars: Episode V –The Empire Strikes Back
Kasdan, Lawrence; Lucas, George (1983). The Art of Return of the Jedi - Star Wars (1st ed.). New York: Ballantine Books. ISBN 978-0345312549. Reprinted 1995 ISBN 9781852865856	Star Wars: Episode VI – Return of the Jedi
Bresman, Jonathan (2000). The Art of Star Wars Episode I The Phantom Menace (1st ed.). New York: Del Rey. ISBN 9780345431097.	Star Wars: Episode I – The Phantom Menace
Vaz, Mark Cotta (2002). Art of Star Wars Episode II Attack of the Clones (1st ed.). New York: Ballantine Publ. Group. ISBN 9780345431257.	Star Wars: Episode II – Attack of the Clones
Rinzler, J.W. (2005). The art of Star Wars: Episode III : Revenge of the Sith (1st ed.). New York: Del Rey. ISBN 9780345431356.	Star Wars: Episode III – Revenge of the Sith
Szostak, Phil (2015). The Art of Star Wars: The Force Awakens. Harry N. Abrams. ISBN 9781419717802.	Star Wars: The Force Awakens
Kushins, Josh (2016). The Art of Rogue One: A Star Wars Story. Harry N. Abrams. ISBN 9781419722257.	Rogue One: A Star Wars Story
Szostak, Phil (2017). The Art of Star Wars:The Last Jedi. Harry N. Abrams. ISBN 9781419727054.	Star Wars: The Last Jedi
Szostak, Phil (2018). The Art of Solo A Star Wars Story. Harry N. Abrams. ISBN 9781419727450.	Solo: A Star Wars Story
Rinzler, J.W. (2014). Star Wars Storyboards: The Original Trilogy. New York: Abrams Books. ISBN 978-1419707742.	Star Wars Storyboards: The Original Trilogy

== See also ==
- List of Star Wars artists
- List of Star Wars reference books
