= Star Wars opening crawl =

Signature title sequence style of numbered Star Wars films

Three frames representative of opening sequences from films in the Skywalker Saga. The phrase "A long time ago in a galaxy far, far away...." which remains static on the screen and the Star Wars logo which shrinks to a central point is common to all of the films and are followed by a film-specific opening crawl. The example shown comes from a post-1981 re-release as Star Wars: Episode IV – A New Hope.

The Star Wars opening crawl is a signature device of the opening sequences of every numbered film of the Star Wars series, an American epic space opera franchise created by George Lucas. Within a black sky background featuring a smattering of stars, the crawl is preceded both by the opening static blue text, "A long time ago in a galaxy far, far away...." and by the Star Wars logo which recedes toward a central point on the screen before disappearing. The crawl text, which describes the backstory and context of the film, then recedes toward a higher point in relation to the screen and with an apparent effect of disappearing in the distance. The visuals are accompanied by the "Main Title Theme", composed by John Williams.

This sequence has featured at the beginning of each of the main Star Wars saga theatrical films produced by Lucasfilm. Although it has retained the same basic elements, the opening crawl has significantly evolved throughout the series. It is one of the most immediately recognizable elements of the franchise and has been frequently parodied.

The opening crawl was not used in the animated film Star Wars: The Clone Wars or in the Star Wars anthology films, Rogue One, Solo, and The Mandalorian and Grogu, although the former three films begin with the opening text. Additionally, the opening sequences of Solo and The Mandalorian and Grogu continue with a short backstory presented in the same style as the opening text, while The Clone Wars uses a narrator to provide exposition in a similar style to a newsreel. Lucasfilm president Kathleen Kennedy indicated in an 2023 interview that "the crawl's coming back", adding that the crawl is "for movies", indicating that Star Wars TV shows would not have the crawl, but all films would. Additionally, Kennedy's successor Dave Filoni stated in a 2026 interview that the crawl is "something that we try to reserve only for saga-type films".

== Structure ==
Each film begins with the static blue text, "A long time ago in a galaxy far, far away....". This is followed by the Star Wars logo shrinking in front of a field of stars, as if moving away from the viewer, and the beginning of the Main Title Theme. Initially, the logo's extremities are beyond the edge of the frame. While the logo is retreating, the "crawl" text begins, starting with the film's episode number and subtitle (with the exception of the original release of Star Wars – see below), and followed by a three-paragraph prologue to the film. The text scrolls up and away from the bottom of the screen towards a vanishing point above the top of the frame in a perspective projection. Each version of the opening crawl ends with a four-dot ellipsis, except for Return of the Jedi, which has a three-dot ellipsis. When the text has nearly reached the vanishing point, it fades out, the camera tilts down (or, in the case of Episode II: Attack of the Clones, up), and the film begins.

Several words are in all-capital letters to emphasise their importance: "DEATH STAR" in Star Wars; "GALACTIC EMPIRE" in Return of the Jedi; "ARMY OF THE REPUBLIC" in Attack of the Clones; "FIRST ORDER", "REPUBLIC", and "RESISTANCE" in The Force Awakens; "FIRST ORDER" and "RESISTANCE" in The Last Jedi; and "REVENGE", "EMPEROR PALPATINE", "GENERAL LEIA ORGANA", "REY", "FIRST ORDER", and "KYLO REN" in The Rise of Skywalker.

Each line of the text spans the width of the screen when it enters from the bottom. In the "fullscreen" (4:3 aspect ratio for standard-definition television) versions of the films, the full lines of text are cut off on the sides until they have scrolled further onto the screen. As a result, by the time the full lines are visible, the text is much smaller and harder to read. In addition, the viewer also has less time to read it.

== Origin ==
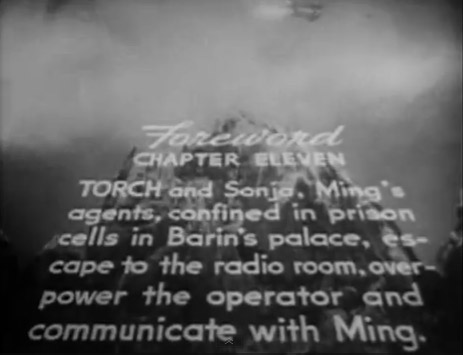
The opening crawl as seen at the beginning of an episode of Flash Gordon Conquers the Universe

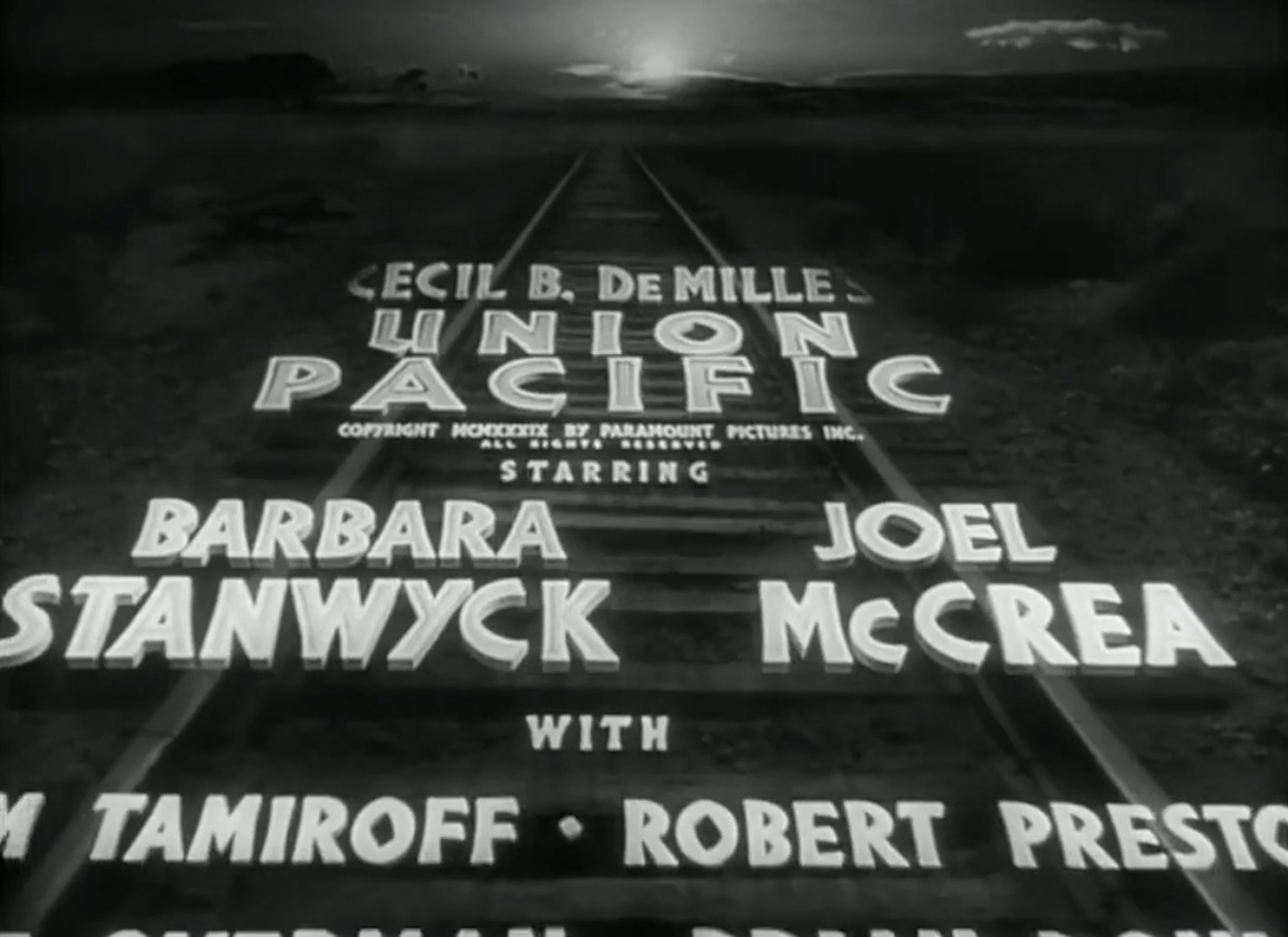
The opening crawl of Cecil B. DeMille's Union Pacific (1939)

Dan Perri's rejected Star Wars logotype

Lucas has stated that the opening crawl was inspired by the opening crawls used at the beginning of each episode of the original Flash Gordon and Buck Rogers film serials, which were the inspiration for Lucas to write much of the Star Wars saga. The development of the opening crawl came about as part of a collaboration between Lucas and the seasoned film title designer Dan Perri. In 1976, Lucas invited Perri to Industrial Light & Magic, Lucasfilm's post-production operation at Van Nuys, California. Perri, who had previously worked on Close Encounters of the Third Kind and The Exorcist, suggested that they take inspiration from the 1939 Cecil B. DeMille film Union Pacific, whose opening credits are shown distorted by a sharp perspective and rolling along a railroad track towards a distant vanishing point. Lucas was keen on the idea, so Perri developed sketches and prototype mechanical artwork. One of the earliest iterations of the opening crawl is evidenced in storyboards drawn by the production artist Alex Tavoularis, depicting the title "THE STAR WARS" as a three-dimensional logo.

Perri also designed a logotype, consisting of block-capital letters filled with stars and skewed towards a vanishing point to follow the same perspective as the opening crawl. Lucas eventually rejected Perri's logo due to readability problems, turning instead to the graphic designer Suzy Rice, an art director at the Los Angeles advertising agency Seiniger Advertising. Lucas had commissioned Rice to design a promotional brochure that was to be distributed to cinema theatre owners. He instructed Rice to produce a logo that would intimidate the viewer, and he reportedly asked for the logo to appear "very fascist" in style. Rice, inspired by historical German typography, produced a bold logotype using an outlined, modified Helvetica Black. After some feedback from Lucas, Rice decided to join the S and T of STAR and the R and S of WARS. Lucas's producer, Gary Kurtz, found that Rice's logo worked well in the opening title; the logo was modified further to flatten the pointed tips on the letter W before it was inserted into the final cut. While Perri's skewed logo did not appear on-screen, it was used widely on pre-release print advertising, and it featured prominently on film posters promoting the release of Star Wars on cinema billboards in 1977 (notably Tom Jung's Style ‘A’ poster, the Style ‘B’ poster by the Brothers Hildebrandt and Tom Chantrell's Style ‘C’ poster).

In a 2005 interview, George Lucas described how the final phrasing of the text for Star Wars came about. "The crawl is such a hard thing because you have to be careful that you're not using too many words that people don't understand. It's like a poem. I showed the very first crawl to a bunch of friends of mine in the '70s. It went on for six paragraphs with four sentences each. Brian De Palma was there...". De Palma helped to edit the text into the form used in the film.

== Production ==
According to Dennis Muren, who worked on the first six films, crawls on the original trilogy films were accomplished by filming physical models laid out on the floor. The models were approximately 60 cm (2') wide and 1.80 m (6') long. The crawl effect was accomplished by the camera moving longitudinally along the model. It was difficult and time-consuming to achieve a smooth scrolling effect. Afterwards, versions in other languages (such as German, French and Spanish) were produced by Industrial Light & Magic.

With the advent of computer-generated graphics, the crawls for the prequel trilogy were achieved much more quickly. The 2004 DVD special edition versions of the original trilogy were later updated with computer-generated crawls as part of their restoration and enhancement.

Lucasfilm president Kathleen Kennedy stated that the 2016 spin-off film Rogue One would "more than likely" eschew certain traditional elements of the franchise, including the crawl, in an effort to distinguish it from the main film series. In fact, Rogue One retains "A long time ago in a galaxy far, far away...", but then immediately cuts to the opening scene with no crawl. At the end of the opening scene, the title "ROGUE ONE" recedes against a star field, like the "STAR WARS" title of the main series, then there is a cut to the next scene.

The second spin-off film Solo does not feature a crawl, but does feature an introductory text shown sentence by sentence in the same font and color as and immediately after "A long time ago in a galaxy far, far away....".

The Mandalorian and Grogu eschews the "A long time ago in a galaxy far, far away..." text - the first for a live-action Star Wars theatrical project - and opening crawl, opting for a similar approach to Solo. The title card appears in a similar manner to the series', and is followed by opening credits, another first for the Star Wars franchise.

== Episode IV original opening crawl ==
The opening crawl in the first Star Wars film is very different from Lucas's original intention. The original text, used in the rough cut he showed to friends and studio executives in February 1977, appears in the Marvel Comics adaptation of the film. When originally released in May 1977, the first film was simply titled Star Wars, as 20th Century Fox forbade Lucas to use a subtitle on grounds that it could be confusing, since there had been no other Star Wars movies prior to 1977. In addition, it was not certain if the film would be followed with a sequel. When The Empire Strikes Back was released in 1980, the episode number, "Episode V", and subtitle "THE EMPIRE STRIKES BACK" appeared as the first two lines of the opening crawl. To match its sequel's crawl, the episode number "Episode IV" and subtitle "A NEW HOPE" were added for the film's theatrical re-release in April 1981. The original version, without the subtitle, was not released again until the 2006 limited edition DVDs. Also, the original version of Episode IV's crawl uses a lowercase "R" for "Rebel spaceships" and "Rebel spies", as, at the time, "Rebel" (in its Star Wars meaning), just like "Imperial", was not considered a demonym-like adjective as it is now.
