= Dan Perri =

American title sequence designer

- Born: New York City, U.S.
- Education: Art Center School
- Known for: Film title & logo design
- Notable work: The Exorcist (1973), Taxi Driver (1976), Star Wars (1977), Raging Bull (1980), Airplane! (1980), Suspiria (2018).
- Website: www.danperri.com

Daniel Richard Perri is an American film and television title sequence designer. He has worked in film title design since the 1970s, and has been responsible for the main titles of a number of notable films including The Exorcist (1973), Taxi Driver (1976), Star Wars (1977), Raging Bull (1980), Airplane! (1980), and Suspiria (2018).

== Early life ==
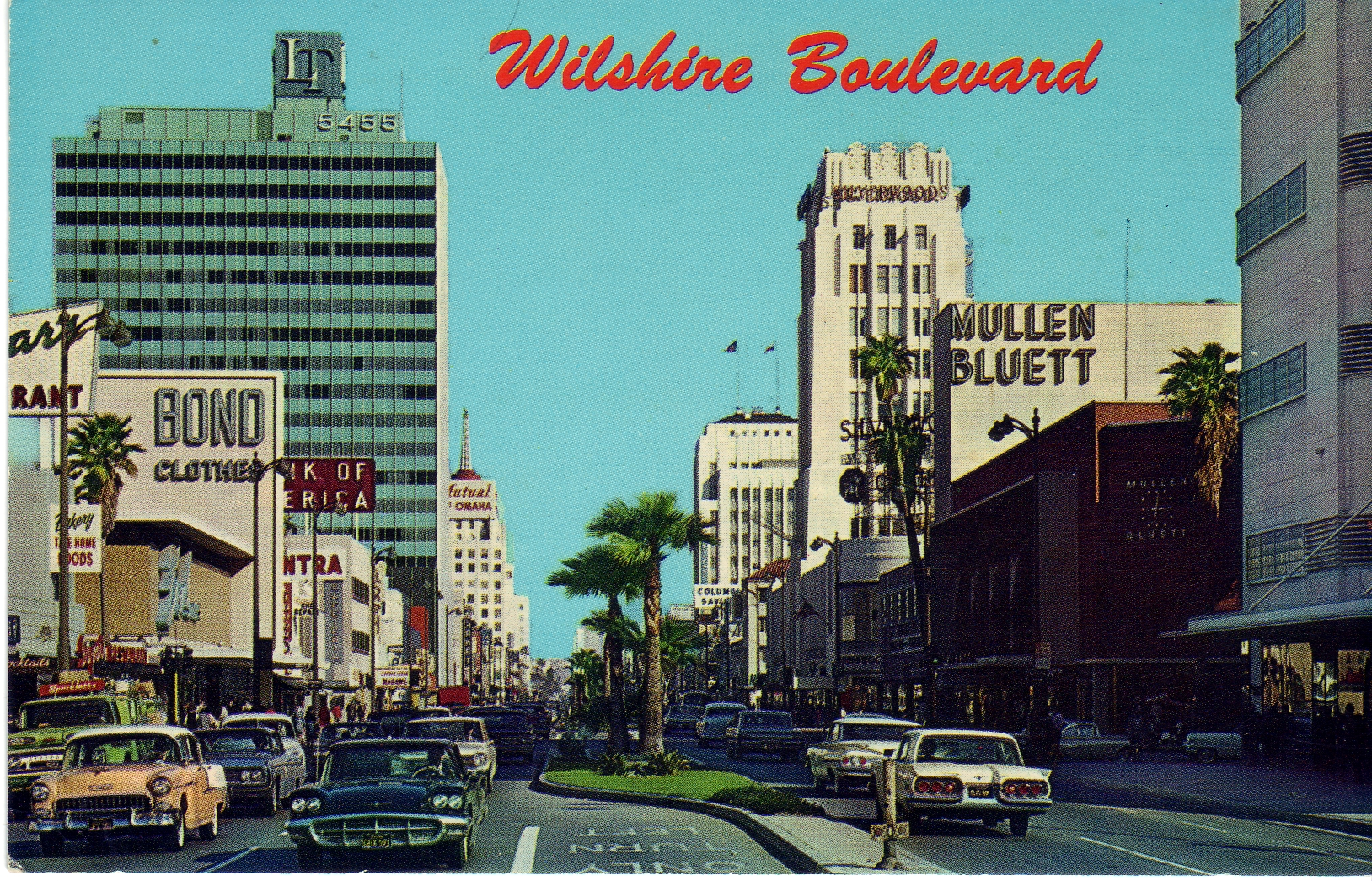
Perri's design career began in the 1960s on Wilshire Boulevard, LA

In 1949 his family moved to Los Angeles to be close to his father's parents, but his mother was unhappy there. Over the next few years Perri's family moved back and forth between LA and New York. Eventually his parents divorced and the young Dan stayed with his mother, who was an artist and encouraged his talent. At the age of twelve Perri set up a small sign painting business on Long Island, selling signage to local stores, markets, bars and restaurants.

At school, Perri's talents were fostered by his art teacher, Barbara Brooks, a former Madison Avenue advertising agency art director who had moved into teaching. She encouraged him to read books, design manuals, and various advertising industry publications such as Graphis publications and Communication Arts magazine. After leaving school in 1963, Perri served a short apprenticeship at Hixson & Jorgensen, an advertising agency on Wilshire Boulevard in LA. Around 1964 he went to study at the Art Center College of Design in Pasadena for a year and a half, before dropping out and going to a local college. Around this time, he started to design graphics for local businesses and album covers for small record companies.

== Career ==
Perri made contact with the film graphics designer Saul Bass and began to pester him for work at his studio on Sunset Boulevard. Eventually Perri found work with Bass through his illustrator, Art Goodman. During his service in the US Navy, Perri served on the USS Repose and designed an on-board newspaper, entitled The Repose Reprise.

After serving in the navy, Perri went to work with Cinefx alongside Phill Norman, Wayne Fitzgerald, Don Record, and a former school friend, Steve Smith. After a year, both Perri and Smith quit and went on to form their own independent design studio, Perri & Smith. The pair worked together from 1969 to 1973, mostly on small, low-budget television features, but their credits also included films such as Electra Glide in Blue and a number of Gene Corman's blaxploitation films. The designers were often exploited and clients sometimes failed to pay, and eventually the business folded.

=== The Exorcist and Taxi Driver ===
Perri's lurid, stylised title sequence for Scorsese's Taxi Driver (1976)

Perri's big break came in 1973 when he was commissioned by Billy Friedkin to produce the main titles for The Exorcist, his first solo project. With a blockbuster film in his portfolio, Perri was now able to attract more work, and soon found himself working on high-profile titles. For Nashville (1975), Robert Altman commissioned a main title sequence and a logo to be used in marketing. Perri produced an unusual, kitschy sequence inspired by low-budget K-Tel Records television commercials, complete with a loud, brash voiceover by Johnny Grant.

In 1976, Martin Scorsese brought Perri in to design the titles for Taxi Driver. Perri took second unit footage and colour-treated the film through a process of film copying and slit-scan, resulting in a highly stylised graphic sequence that evoked the "underbelly" of New York City through lurid colours, glowing neon signs, distorted nocturnal images and deep black levels, accompanied by Bernard Herrmann's jazz soundtrack.

=== Close Encounters ===
Early in the production of Close Encounters of the Third Kind (1977), Steven Spielberg hired Perri to design a logo for the film. With only a script to work from, Perri produced a logotype in Handel Gothic typeface. Spielberg was delighted with the result, and applied the logo to all production stationery and crew shirts. Unusually in filmmaking, Spielberg carried enough influence to maintain creative control over the film's branding, and asked Perri to design the entire advertising campaign for Close Encounters based on his logo.

=== Star Wars ===
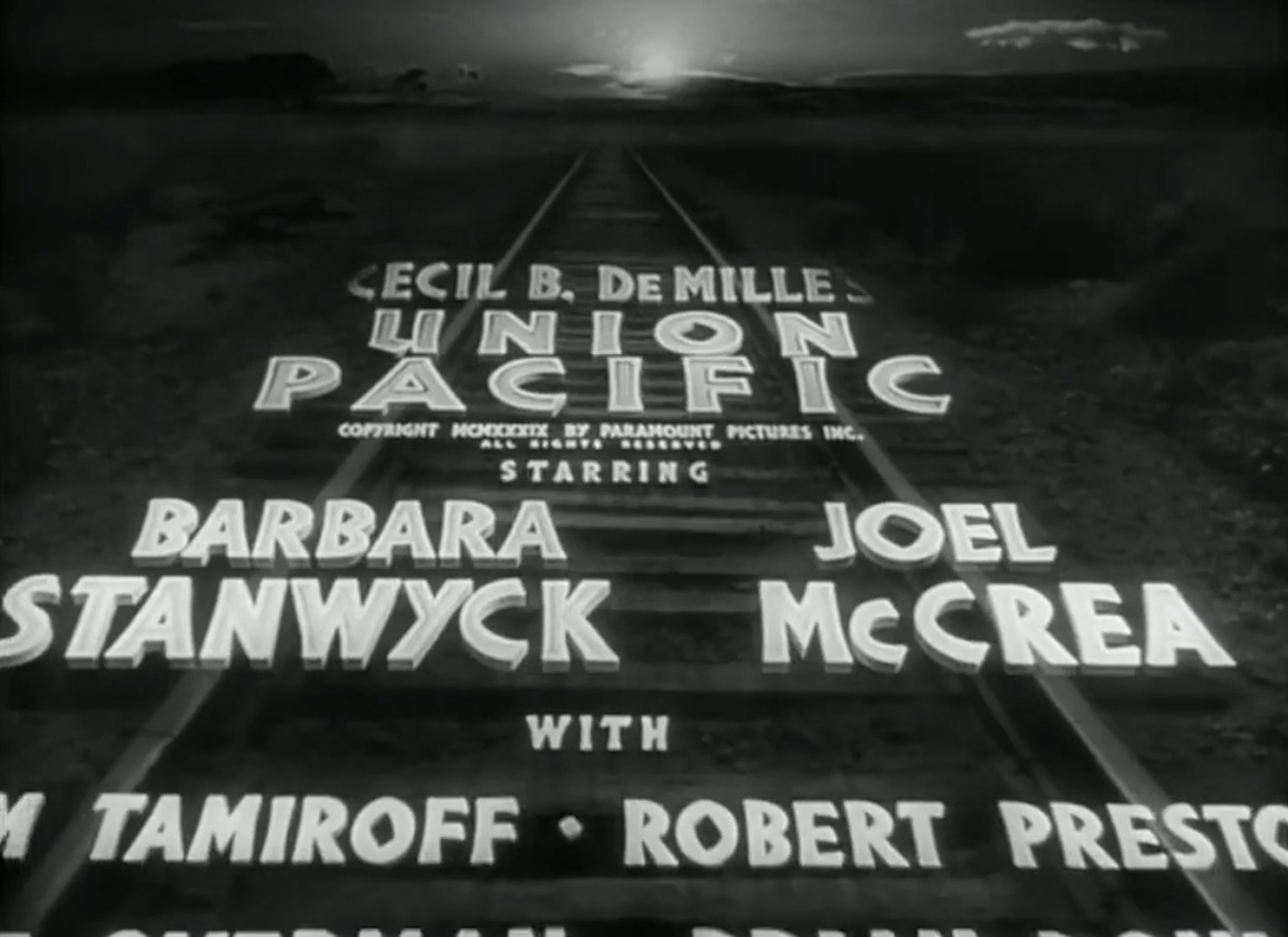
The opening crawl of Cecil B. DeMille's Union Pacific (1939)

Possibly Perri's best-known title sequence project came about in 1976 when his friend James Nelson was working on post-production for a new space fantasy film, Star Wars. Nelson recommended Perri to director George Lucas, who invited Perri to Industrial Light & Magic, Lucasfilm's post-production operation at Van Nuys, California. Lucas briefed Perri to take inspiration from old 1930s cinema serials such as Flash Gordon and Buck Rogers that had inspired Lucas to write much of his Star Wars story. After struggling to come up with a concept that Lucas liked, Perri eventually developed a concept for presenting a textual introduction based on the opening credits of the 1939 Cecil B. DeMille film, Union Pacific, in which the credits are shown distorted by a sharp perspective and rolling along a railroad track towards a distant vanishing point. Lucas approved of the idea and Perri produced sketches and prototype mechanical artwork, supported by storyboard artwork drawn by the production artist Alex Tavoularis. This gave birth to the now-familiar opening crawl sequence that appears in the Star Wars films.

Dan Perri's rejected Star Wars logotype

Perri also designed a logotype, consisting of block-capital letters filled with stars and skewed towards a vanishing point to follow the same perspective as the opening crawl. Lucas eventually rejected Perri's logo due to readability problems, turning instead to the graphic designer Suzy Rice, an art director at Seiniger Advertising, who designed the flat Star Wars logo that was inserted into the final cut of the film. While Perri's skewed logo did not appear on-screen, it was used widely on pre-release print advertising, and it featured prominently on film posters promoting the release of Star Wars on cinema billboards in 1977 (notably Tom Jung's Style ‘A’ poster, the Style ‘B’ poster by the Brothers Hildebrandt and Tom Chantrell's Style ‘C’ poster).

Perri has stated that Lucas offered him a share of royalties from the film in lieu of his ordinary fee; Perri rejected the offer and has since regretted his choice.

=== Later work ===
Perri worked for Scorsese again in 1980, designing a title sequence for Raging Bull. This featured a strong red logotype which emphasised the maniacal quality of the lead character, introducing a film that was shot in black and white. This caused technical problems when the film distributor spliced together colour film stock for the title and monochrome stock for the rest of the picture.

Perri's subsequent credits have included The Fan (1981), The Equalizer (1985), The Player (1992). More recently, he designed the titles for Gangs of New York (2002) and The Beaver (2011).

In 2018, Perri produced the logotype and main title sequence for Luca Guadagnino's film Suspiria (2018).

== Selected filmography ==
Year	Title
1973	The Exorcist
1975	Nashville
1976	Taxi Driver
1976	All the President's Men
1976	Marathon Man
1977	The Late Show
1977	The White Buffalo
1977	Star Wars
1977	Exorcist II: The Heretic
1977	New York, New York
1977	Close Encounters of the Third Kind
1977	Capricorn One
1979	The Warriors
1980	Airplane!
1980	Raging Bull
1982	An Officer and a Gentleman
1984	A Nightmare on Elm Street
1985	White Nights
1986	9½ Weeks
1986	Wise Guys
1985-1986	Saturday Night Live
1986	Tough Guys
1986	The Color of Money
1987	A Nightmare on Elm Street 3: Dream Warriors
1987	Raising Arizona
1987	La Bamba
1987	Wall Street
1988	Midnight Run
1990	Lord of the Flies
1989-1990	Falcon Crest
1990	RoboCop 2
1990	The Rescuers Down Under
1993	Sister Act 2: Back in the Habit
1996	Mulholland Falls
2002	Gangs of New York
2004	The Aviator
2006	The House of Usher
2007	In the Valley of Elah
2011	The Beaver
2017	First House on the Hill
2018	Suspiria

== See also ==
- List of Star Wars artists
