= Heir to the Empire Sourcebook =

Tabletop space opera role-playing game supplement

The New Republic
Heir to the Empire Sourcebook
- Cover art by Tom Jung.
- Designers: Bill Slavicsek
- Publishers: West End Games
- Publication: 1992 Hardcover (40056); 1992 Softcover (40068); 1996 The Thrawn Trilogy Sourcebook (40131)
- Genres: Space opera
- Systems: D6 System
- ISBN: 978-0874311792

The New Republic: Heir to the Empire Sourcebook is a supplement published by West End Games (WEG) in 1992 for Star Wars: The Roleplaying Game, itself based on the Star Wars franchise.

== Contents ==
Heir to the Empire Sourcebook provides gamemasters with resources to create campaigns set in the days immediately following the fall of the Star Wars Empire depicted in the movie Return of the Jedi. The material in the book is based upon the novel Heir to the Empire by Timothy Zahn, the first book in Zahn's Thrawn trilogy. Information, background and game statistics are provided for all of the characters, alien races, droids and starships mentioned in Zahn's book.

With the fall of the Empire and establishment of the New Republic, player characters are no longer secret operatives, but can now openly operate as "troubleshooters, representatives and soldiers."

== Publication history ==
In 1987, to celebrate the 10th anniversary of Star Wars, Lucasfilm licensed WEG to produce a role-playing game based on the first three Star Wars movies. The result was Star Wars: The Roleplaying Game. From 1987 to 1991, WEG produced 23 supplementary sourcebooks, all based on the original three movies (now known as Episodes IV–VI). In 1991, Lucasfilm hired Timothy Zahn to write novels set after the end of the first three movies, and Zahn subsequently produced Heir to the Empire (1991), the first book of the Thrawn Trilogy. WEG produced Heir to the Empire Sourcebook in 1992, a 144-page hardcover sourcebook (replaced in the second printing by a softcover version) designed by Bill Slavicsek, with interior art by Allen Nunis, Xeno Beck, and Paul Daly, and cover art by Tom Jung. Following its release, WEG published the second edition rules for Star Wars: The Roleplaying Game, making Heir to the Empire Sourcebook the last book published under the first edition rules.

== Reception ==
In Issue 68 of Challenge, Steve Maggi lauded this book, commenting, "There is finally solid information for a running a Star Wars campaign beyond the events in Return of the Jedi." He admired the production values of the hardcover version, especially the illustrations, calling them "very helpful in establishing the look and mood of the era." However, Maggi was disappointed by the repetition of "information already printed in previous works for the Star Wars RPG", including information on starfighters and primary capital ships, as well as the plot and basics about the Star Wars universe." He was also disappointed that much of the text in the sourcebook was a paraphrase of the Timothy Zahn novel, and also noted the "lack of adventure material. It would have been very helpful {...} if this book came with a sample adventure." He concluded with an ambivalent recommendation, saying, "If you are a Star Wars fan {...] this book is a must [...} For gamers who only collect material that pertains to the game, I would not recommend this book."

In the November 1993 edition of Dragon (Issue #199), Rick Swan liked the production values of the softcover version, calling it "handsome", and thought the opening chapter provided "an excellent overview of the Republic." He called the chapters containing updates on all essential Star Wars characters and the new characters introduced in the Zahn novel "an indispensable base for staging original adventures, even for players intimately familiar with the [Zahn] novel." However, Swan wished that the book had removed information on planets and aliens and instead "used the pages for an adventure or campaign material [...] I would have preferred a collection of original scenarios or more tips on how to design them myself. It’s a frustrating omission in an otherwise superb sourcebook." He concluded by giving this book an above average rating of 4 out of 5, saying, "Heir to the Empire should be considered a core component of the New Republic line."

== Other reviews ==
- Backstab Issue 1 (January–February 1997, p. 50, in French)

== See also ==
- Dark Force Rising Sourcebook, based on Zahn's second novel in the Thrawn Trilogy.
- The Last Command Sourcebook, based on Zahn's third novel in the Thrawn Trilogy.
