= Suzy Rice =

American graphic designer

Susan Elizabeth Rice
- Education: Western Illinois University, University of Florida, University of California, Irvine
- Known for: Film title & logo design
- Notable work: The Star Wars logo
- Website: www.suzyrice.com

Susan "Suzy" Elizabeth Rice is a screenwriter, author of fiction, painter and designer. Rice is noted as the designer of the logo for the series of Star Wars films, as well as many other film logo designs for print advertising and some filmed applications.

== Life ==
Rice was educated at Western Illinois University, the University of Florida and the University of California, Irvine.

Whilst studying at Florida, Rice married the screenwriter and novelist Daniel H. Vining. She and Vining divorced, and she later married the designer and Rolling Stone art director Anthony S. "Tony" Lane and worked under the name of Suzy Rice-Lane.

Rice lived and worked in Maui, Hawaii, for eight years where she worked as a painter before returning to California.

== Work ==
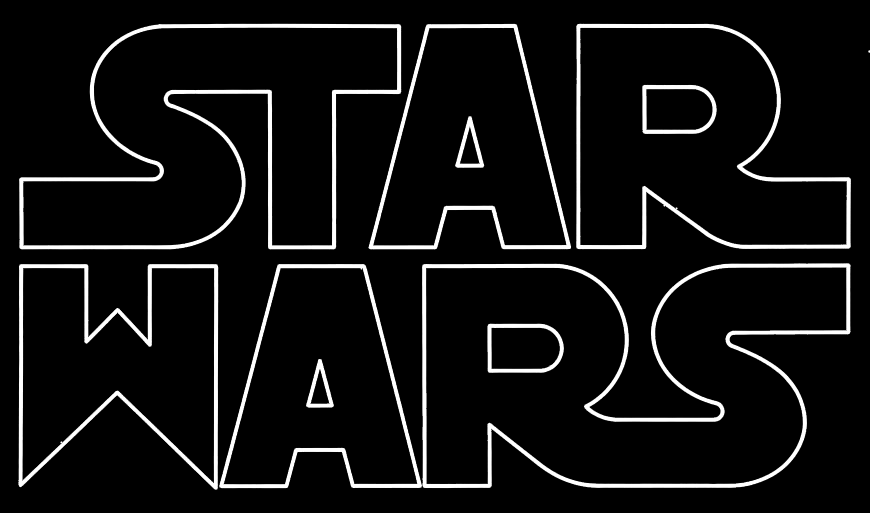
Suzy Rice's original Star Wars logo

The final version of Rice's famous Star Wars logo (1977)

Title sequence designer Dan Perri's original Star Wars logo

Early in her career, Rice designed Dancing Madness (1976), a book written by Abe Peck, who was at the time an associate editor at Rolling Stone magazine. This led Rice to work as assistant art director and designer for the magazine under her then-married name of Suzy Vining.

At the age of 22, she took up the position of art director at the Los Angeles advertising agency Seiniger Advertising. In late 1976, the agency was approached by the film distributor Twentieth Century Fox which needed to promote a new epic space opera, Star Wars, in post-production at the time. Fox commissioned a brochure which they would send out to cinema theater owners, and Rice was given the job of designing it.

Rice liaised with Lucasfilm, Ltd. and on a visit to their visual effects production company, Industrial Light & Magic in Van Nuys, she met with the director, George Lucas. Lucas instructed Rice to produce a logo that would intimidate the viewer, and he reportedly asked for the logo to appear "very fascist" in style. Rice took a keen interest in typography and studied German font design for this task. Her response to her brief was to produce a bold logotype using an outlined, modified Helvetica Black. After some feedback from Lucas, Rice decided to join the S and T of STAR and the R and S of WARS. In the version approved by Lucas, the letter W had sharp, pointed tips. Lucas signed off the brochure in between takes while involved in second unit filming.

The logo designed by Rice was not the original logo; Dan Perri, a seasoned Hollywood title sequence designer who developed the film's now-famous opening crawl, had produced an earlier logotype consisting of block-capital letters filled with stars and skewed towards a vanishing point. Perri's logo design was originally conceived to follow the same perspective as the opening crawl, and while it did not appear on-screen, it was used widely on pre-release print advertising and on cinema marquees. The producer of Star Wars, Gary Kurtz, was impressed with Rice's logo and selected it over Perri's design for the film's opening titles, after modifying the letter W to flatten the pointed tips originally designed by Rice. This finalised the design of one of the most recognisable logos in cinema design, although Rice's contribution was not credited in the film.

Rice designed a poster in 1978 advertising a series of concerts of the Star Wars symphonic suite by John Williams. It features Rice's logo and an illustration by John Alvin of C-3PO and R2-D2 carrying one-man band kits of musical instruments.

While employed at Seiniger Advertising, Rice was responsible for title design work and print advertising campaigns for a number of other films. She also designed a number of record album covers and various logos, posters and print advertising for the entertainment and healthcare industries. Years after her work for Seiniger Advertising and Lucasfilm, Rice returned to full-time education at the University of California, Irvine.

== Publications ==
- Rice, Suzy (art direction and design) (1976). Peck, Abe (ed.). Dancing Madness. New York: Rolling Stone Press/Anchor Press. ISBN 9780385114783.

== See also ==
- List of Star Wars artists
- Category:Star Wars (film franchise) posters
