= List of Star Wars artists =

This lists visual artists and illustrators who are associated with the Star Wars film franchise and derivative works.

== Production artists ==
- Colin Cantwell
- Doug Chiang
- Stuart Freeborn
- Joe Johnston
- Iain McCaig
- Ralph McQuarrie
- John Mollo
- Brian Muir
- Dan Perri
- Suzy Rice
- Terryl Whitlatch – also wrote and illustrated The Wildlife of Star Wars

== Film poster artists ==
- John Berkey
- Matt Busch
- Tom Chantrell
- The Brothers Hildebrandt
- Tom Jung
- Josh Kirby
- Drew Struzan

== Comics artists ==
- Scott Campbell
- John Cassaday
- Howard Chaykin
- Gene Day
- Terry Dodson
- Dave Dorman
- Ron Frenz
- Rick Hoberg
- Tom Hodges
- Carmine Infantino
- Cynthia Martin
- Walt Simonson
- Al Williamson

== See also ==
- The Art of Star Wars
- Star Wars comics
- Category:Star Wars (film franchise) posters
- Concept art
