= Chantrell =

Chantrell is a surname. Notable people with the surname include:

- Robert Dennis Chantrell (1793–1872), English church architect
- Tom Chantrell (1916–2001), English illustrator and cinema poster artist
