= Dark Force Rising Sourcebook =

Tabletop space opera role-playing game supplement

The New Republic
Dark Force Rising Sourcebook
- Cover art by Tom Jung
- Designers: Bill Slavicsek
- Publishers: West End Games
- Publication: 1992 Hardcover (40058); 1993 Softcover (40074); 1996 The Thrawn Trilogy Sourcebook (40131)
- Genres: Space opera
- Systems: D6 System
- ISBN: 0-87431-182-9

The New Republic: Dark Force Rising Sourcebook is a supplement published by West End Games in 1992 for the science fiction role-playing Star Wars: The Roleplaying Game.

== Contents ==
In 1987, four years after the release of the third (and at the time, the final) Star Wars movie, Return of the Jedi, West End Games published the popular Star Wars: The Roleplaying Game. However, by 1992, having published many supplements and adventures, West End Games was finding it increasingly difficult to create original material out of the original trilogy of movies; they decided to release a second edition of the game called The New Republic, based on the Thrawn trilogy of novels by Timothy Zahn. Several sourcebooks were released based on the novels; the second book, Dark Force Rising Sourcebook, takes its material from the second novel of the trilogy, Dark Force Rising.

Dark Force Rising Sourcebook is a 144-page softcover book written by Bill Slavicsek, with graphics and illustrations by Stephen Crane, Mike Nielsen, Dana Knutson, Rob Caswell, John Paul Lona, and Mike Vilardi, with cover art by Tom Jung. The sourcebook gives biographical profiles of notable personalities from Zahn's novel, and brief profiles of planets and aliens mentioned in the novel.

== Reception ==
Chris Hind reviewed Dark Force Rising Sourcebook in White Wolf #35 (March/April, 1993), rating it a 4 out of 5 and stated that "The book bills itself as useful for non-roleplayers who enjoyed Dark Force Rising. For the price, I disagree. However, roleplayers who enjoyed the novel and wish to enhance their gaems with Zahn's imagination will find the sourcebook worthwhile. Even for GMs who have not (gasp!) read the original, Dark Force Rising Sourcebook has plenty to offer."

In the November 1993 edition of Dragon (Issue #199), Rick Swan found that although the biographical "background summaries are informative and enlightening," the book was otherwise remarkably light on substantive content. Swan thought the book "feels tentative and inclusive; there doesn't seem to be enough material to justify a 144-page book." Swan gave Dark Force Rising Sourcebook an average rating of 3.5 stars out of 6, saying that "players on a budget" could probably get along without it.

== See also ==
- Heir to the Empire Sourcebook, based on Zahn's first novel in the Thrawn Trilogy.
- The Last Command Sourcebook, based on Zahn's third novel in the Thrawn Trilogy.
