= The Last Command Sourcebook =

Tabletop space opera role-playing game supplement

The New Republic
The Last Command Sourcebook
- Cover art by Tom Jung
- Designers: Eric Trautmann
- Publishers: West End Games
- Publication: 1992
- Genres: Space opera
- Systems: D6 System
- ISBN: 0-87431-197-7

The New Republic: The Last Command Sourcebook is a supplement published by West End Games (WEG) in 1994 for the role-playing game Star Wars: The Roleplaying Game that is based on The Last Command, the third and final novel in the Heir to the Empire trilogy by Timothy Zahn.

== Contents ==
The Last Command Sourcebook enables a gamemaster to design a d6 System adventure that will reveal the final secrets from the Timothy Zahn novel of the same name. The book is divided into twelve chapters:

1. "The New Republic" Re-introduction of notable heroes from the first two books of the Thrawn trilogy, as well as new non-player characters
2. "The Force of the Empire"Re-introduction of villains and new military NPCs that will be encountered.
3. "Tactics and Battles" Tactics to be used by both the Republic and the Empire.
4. "The Fringe" NPCs from the margins of society, both old and new.
5. "Planets" Profile of 25 planets that may be important.
6. "Mount Tantiss" A large cloning center created many years ago by Palpatine.
7. "Creatures" Six new creatures.
8. "Aliens" Ten alien races.
9. "The Noghri" Details of how this race is trying to clean up their planet, and several key NPCs.
10. "Equipment and Droids" New items: 3 pieces of equipment, 4 weapons, 2 droids.
11. Vehicles" Two new vehicles.
12. "Starships" Several new starships.

== Publication history ==
WEG acquired the license to create a role-playing game based on the Star Wars franchise in 1987, and published Star Wars: The Roleplaying Game, which used the d6 System rules. The game proved popular, and WEG published many adventures and supplements.

Between 1991 and 1993, Timothy Zahn created the Heir to the Empire trilogy — Heir to the Empire, Dark Force Rising, and The Last Command — and WEG responded by creating a sourcebook of information for each novel that could be used in the role-playing game. The Last Command, a 144-page hardcover book, was written by Eric Trautmann, with cover art by Tom Jung, and interior illustrations by Stephen Crane, Paul Daly, Tim Eldred, Allen Nunis, Terry Pavlet, David A. Plunkett, Dan Schaefer, Brian Schomburg, and Michael Vilardi.

== Reception ==
In Issue 210 of Dragon (October 1994), Rick Swan noted that this supplement measured up to quality of the first two in the series. Swan especially liked the "impressive" graphics that included "a blueprint of the Golan Space Defense Station and a schematic of Mount Tantiss." Swan concluded by warning that "if you read the source book first, you'll spoil the surprises in the novel."

== See also ==
- Heir to the Empire Sourcebook, based on Zahn's first novel in the Thrawn Trilogy.
- Dark Force Rising Sourcebook, based on Zahn's second novel in the Thrawn Trilogy.
