= Chicago Seed (newspaper) =

American underground newspaper (1967–1974)

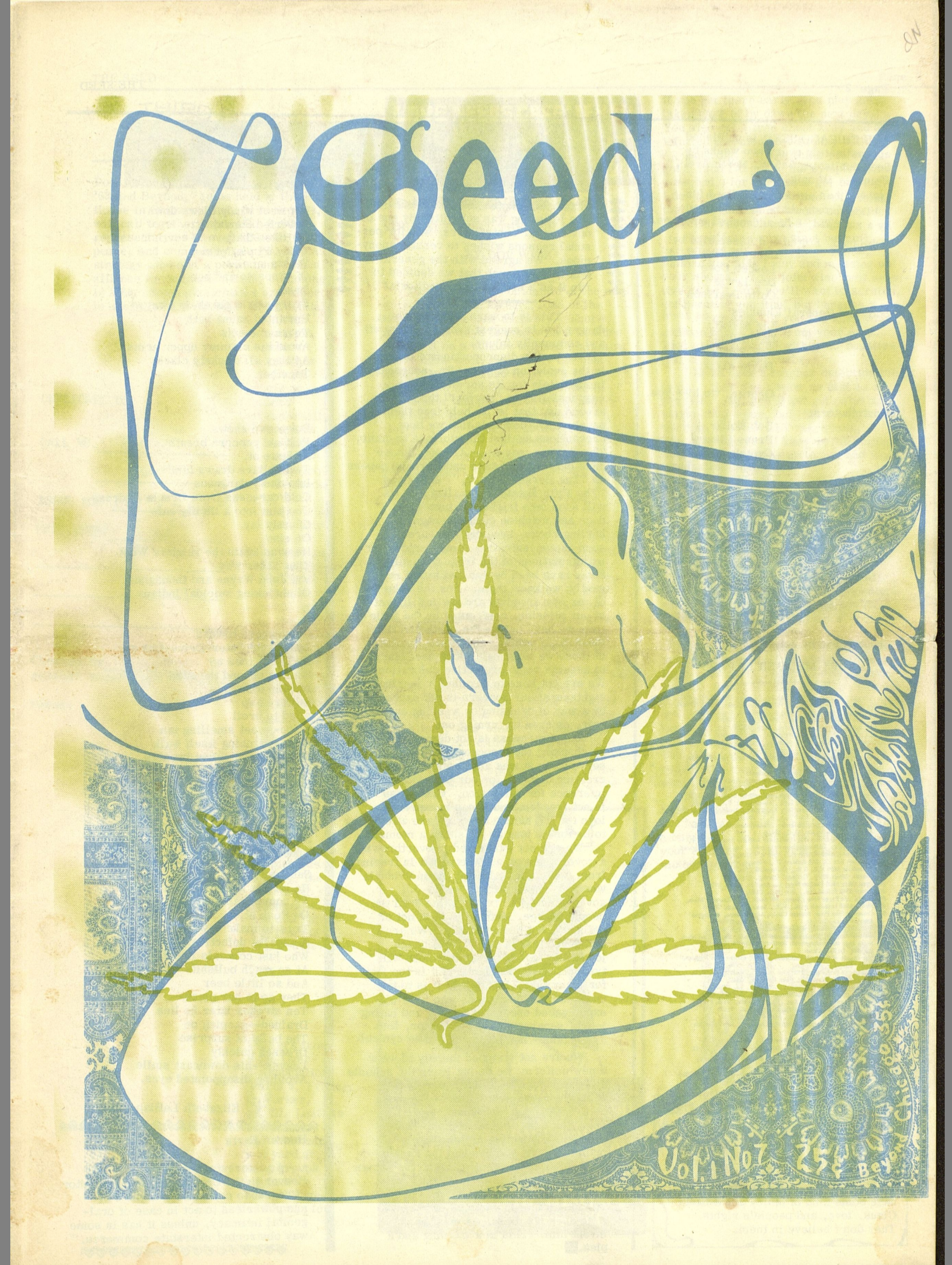
- Cover of the September 1967 issue
- Type: Underground newspaper
- Format: Biweekly tabloid
- Owner: Seed Publishing
- Founder(s): Don Lewis and Earl Segal
- Staff writers: Abe Peck, Eliot Wald
- Founded: May 1967; 59 years ago in Chicago
- Ceased publication: 1974; 52 years ago
- Headquarters: Old Town, Chicago, Illinois, U.S.
- Circulation: 30,000–40,000

The Chicago Seed was an underground newspaper published biweekly in Chicago, Illinois, from May 1967 to 1974; there were 121 issues published in all. It was notable for its colorful psychedelic graphics and its eclectic, non-doctrinaire radical politics. Important events covered by Seed writers and artists were the trial of the Chicago Eight, Woodstock, and the murder of Fred Hampton. At its peak, the Seed circulated between 30,000 and 40,000 copies, with national distribution.

== Publication history ==
After attending the March 1967 Underground Press Syndicate (UPS) gathering held in Stinson Beach, California, artist Don Lewis and Earl Segal (a.k.a. the Mole, owner of the Mole Hole, a local head shop) launched the Seed and joined UPS. The paper also later became a subscriber to the Liberation News Service.

Lester Dore took over the art direction when Don Lewis moved to New York to work for Screw magazine. Disagreements between Lewis and Segal led to the Seed's purchase by Harry Dewar, a graphic designer, and Colin Pearlson, a photographer, who thought it had commercial potential.

The Seed was edited for several years by Abe Peck, who started as a staff writer in late 1967. He became editor soon afterward, and led the paper toward the Yippies (Youth International Party), a group that planned surrealistic-oriented events for the 1968 Democratic National Convention. Despite a split with Abbie Hoffman and Jerry Rubin over tactics and transparency, Peck and other Seed staffers appeared in Lincoln Park throughout the August 1968 demonstrations.

Skeets Millard, a young photographer and community organizer who was publishing the Chicago edition of Kaleidoscope, joined the Seed staff in 1969, at a time when all of the original founders were gone and there was no one working on the paper who had been there more than 12 months; Mike Abrahamson was running the paper in Abe Peck's absence. Among the staff writers were Marshall Rosenthal and Eliot Wald.

While supporting various movements, the Seed remained independent of organizational affiliation. Although the paper was far left-leaning, it was known for its independence and impartiality on left-wing issues, not subscribing to a particular ideology, which was unusual for the time. The Seed grew increasingly radical, however, and Peck left the paper in 1970.

== Design aesthetic and production process ==
The paper was known for its colorful printing, artwork and comix, with Skip Williamson, Jay Lynch, Jim Roslof, Robert Crumb, Karl Heinz-Meschbach, Paul Zmiewski, Peter Solt, and other Sixties artists contributing to the publication's unique look:

"Covers ... favored bold images that told a bigger story instead of everyday photos.... The inside could be just as striking, featuring poster-size pullouts with Day-Glo ink, gradient backgrounds, a wealth of major-label music ads, and intricate drawings".

The Seed, along with the San Francisco Oracle, was one of the first tabloid newspapers to use Split-fount inking on a web press. It was a real do it yourself operation: copy was set on an IBM Selectric and pasted up, negatives were made and stripped up for plate-making, and inks were mixed to take to the printer.

After losing its original printer in 1968, the Seed was printed for a time on the presses of liberal Wisconsin newspaper publisher Bill Schanen, who provided printing services for a large number of Midwestern underground papers that could find no other printer. However, the Seed continued to be printed in Chicago into the 70's by the same printer who was printing the Black Panther News and other local left leaning publications.

== See also ==
- List of underground newspapers of the 1960s counterculture
