= Tom Chantrell =

English artist (1916–2001)

- Chantrell in his studio, c. 1960
- Born: Thomas William Chantrell; 20 December 1916; Ardwick, Manchester, England
- Died: 15 July 2001 (aged 84)
- Education: Manchester Art College
- Known for: Film posters, album covers, book jackets
- Notable work: Brighton Rock (1947); The King And I (1956); Carry On Cleo (1964); The Sound of Music (1965); One Million Years B.C. (1966); Far From The Madding Crowd (1967); Star Wars (1977)
- Spouse(s): Alice Chantrell; Shirley How Har Lui
- Website: www.chantrellposter.com

Thomas William Chantrell (20 December 1916 – 15 July 2001) was a British illustrator and cinema poster artist.

Born the son of a circus performer in Manchester, England, he started work in advertising as an illustrator. During WWII he put his artistic skills to use designing propaganda posters for the war effort. After the war, he established a career in cinema advertising, and established his name designing posters for epic films such as The King and I (1956), One Million Years B.C. (1966) and Star Wars (1977), as well as Hammer horror films and Carry On comedy films.

== Early life ==
Tom Chantrell was born in Ardwick, Manchester, the son of Emily and James Chantrell, 64-year-old trapeze artist and jazz musician. James had toured music halls around the world performing in a trapeze act called "The Fabulous Chantrells". Chantrell grew up in a family of girls, the youngest of nine children.

Chantrell displayed an aptitude for commercial illustration when, at the age of five, he was asked by his teacher at Armitage Street School to paint a picture of the character Tom from Charles Kingsley's book The Water Babies; the teacher was so impressed by the young Chantrell's artwork that she paid him one penny for the painting.

At grammar school, Chantrell's artistic skills were fostered by his art teacher, and at the age of 13 he won a national competition run by the League of Nations to design a poster promoting disarmament. He left school aged 15 and went to Manchester Art College, but quickly became disillusioned and left soon after to enter employment.

== Career ==
Within days of leaving college in 1933, Chantrell found a position at a local advertising agency, Rydales, leaving a few months later to join another agency where he worked for about year. Chantrell's position ended after he was wrongly blamed for a substandard piece of work; after a violent disagreement with his manager, Chantrell was fired. Unable to find any more work in Manchester, Chantrell moved to London in 1934 to live with one of his sisters, Phyllis, in Hampstead.

He took up work at a printing company, where he developed his skills in silkscreen printing. After two years, he moved to a small design studio, Bateman Artists, on Carmelite Street, near Blackfriars Bridge. Batemans shared a building – and design work – with a larger agency, Allardyce Palmer, who sub-contracted Batemans work for industrial clients such as British Aluminium, and Percival Provost.

Allardyce Palmer had just won accounts with two emerging film studios, Warner Brothers and 20th Century Fox; a cinema was not considered an especially glamorous industry at the time, the work was also passed on to Batemans. Through this association, Chantrell had the opportunity to start working on cinema advertising, designing his first film poster in 1938 for The Amazing Dr. Clitterhouse.

=== Military service ===
He continued with posters until World War II, when he was called up to military service. Registered as a conscientious objector, he was assigned to the Non-Combatant Corps of the British Army, later volunteering for duties with a bomb disposal unit of the Royal Engineers in Tunbridge Wells, and spent most of the war digging unexploded ordnance and mines out of beaches on the coast of Kent and Sussex.

In the army, Chantrell developed a disdain for authority after one notable assignment to defuse a flying bomb near Leysdown-on-Sea on the Isle of Sheppey; the commanding officer was later awarded an OBE, despite being absent from operations on leave. In his last year of military service, Chantrell was transferred to a war propaganda unit, where he was able to put his artistic talents to the war effort. He was demobbed in 1946, and he returned to work at Allardyce Palmer, now located on Kingsway in Holborn. Here, he took on an increasing amount of work on designing cinema posters, beginning with Forever Amber (1947) and Brighton Rock.

=== 1950s and 60s ===
Chantrell's poster for One Million Years B.C. (1966) featured a popular image of Raquel Welch

In 1950 Batemans was bought out by Allardyce Palmer, and the merged agency continued to receive a lot of work through Warner Brothers' film distributor, British Pathé. Poster artist Tom Beauvais joined the company as Chantrell's assistant. In 1957 Chantrell was made art director of Allardyce Palmer's new Entertainments Publicity Division in Screen House on Wardour Street, Soho. Film work flooded in, and Chantrell worked on a number of epic films such as East of Eden (1955), The King and I (1956), Anastasia (1956), Bus Stop (1956), An Affair To Remember (1957) and South Pacific (1958).

Chantrell worked for two leading horror film production companies, Hammer Films and Amicus Productions, and for a few years worked as the "house artist" at Hammer, designing celebrated posters for films such as The Nanny (1965) and Taste the Blood of Dracula (1969). For Amicus, Chantrell produced publicity for a number of fantasy films based on the books of Edgar Rice Burroughs, including The Land That Time Forgot (1975). His paintings from this era have been noted for their lurid use of colour to emphasise elements of primordial horror and for their use of bold, red block lettering to convey a sense of shock, as exemplified in his posters for One Million Years B.C. (1966) and At the Earth's Core (1976). Chantrell's One Million Years B.C. poster was based on a very popular publicity photo of actress Raquel Welch in a fur bikini that became something of a cultural phenomenon and a best-selling pinup picture.

Chantrell designed many posters for the Carry On film comedy series. Some of these films were conceived as parodies of other contemporary movies, and Chantrell correspondingly produced pastiche artwork of the original film poster. On at least two occasions this led to problems with copyright; his poster for Carry On Spying (1964) had to be changed to avoid looking too much like the Renato Fratini poster for From Russia with Love; and his initial Carry On Cleo poster (1964) was pulled and redesigned after a lawsuit from 20th Century Fox alleged that his send-up bore too much resemblance to original Howard Terpning Cleopatra artwork.

In the 1960s Chantrell was often drawing artwork for 5 different films or double bills at one time.

Among other films he designed the artwork for were Von Ryan's Express and The Anniversary.

=== Star Wars ===
Theatrical Style 'C' quad poster for the UK release of Star Wars (1977), featuring the iconic logo by Dan Perri

In 1977 Chantrell was commissioned by 20th Century Fox to produce poster art for the British release of a space fantasy film, Star Wars. Several promotional posters had already been produced to advertise Star Wars prior to Chantrell's involvement; artist Tom Jung was initially commissioned by Fox to create a poster, which was used to advertise the USA release. Now known as Style 'A', this artwork was considered by Lucasfilm to be "too dark" and they commissioned a reworking of the image from the Brothers Hildebrandt, and their Style 'B' poster was distributed to UK cinemas. Because these posters had both been produced while Star Wars was still in production, the artists had worked without reference to photographs of the actual cast. Fox executives considered the posters too abstract and were keen to commission a new version with fully realised likenesses of the lead actors.

Chantrell was invited with his family to the film premiere, and he was given a pack of film stills and publicity photos to use as a reference for his painting. He took one month to complete the poster, the longest he had ever worked on one poster. When completed, Tom Chantrell's Style 'C' poster quickly replaced the Hildebrandts' Style 'B' on cinema billboards, becoming one of Chantrell's most widely recognised works.

Chantrell's poster depicts a trio of Mark Hamill, Carrie Fisher and Harrison Ford's characters brandishing blaster guns, in a style that was inspired by Frank McCarthy's poster for The Dirty Dozen (1967). Behind them, a large image of Darth Vader looms holding a lightsaber, surrounded by smaller characters and a montage of starfighters in combat. The poster is noted because Hamill points his weapon and looks directly towards the viewer. Because of Chantrell's long association with Hammer productions, he included Peter Cushing on his poster; this was the only Star Wars theatrical poster that ever featured Cushing's likeness.

Chantrell's posters were often produced prior to the film being made to raise money from investors, and he did not see the films he drew for; he would receive a plot line and a handful of stills and use friends and family for poses. Examples of this were taking photographs of himself trying to look like a vampire for Dracula Has Risen from the Grave. In his work for Star Wars, although he had seen the film and had photographic references of the actors, he asked his wife Shirley to pose as a body model for Princess Leia in their back garden, wearing a dressing gown and holding a toy plastic sword.

Chantrell's poster art for international releases of Star Wars featured in the Carol Titelman's 1979 book The Art of Star Wars, where he is credited as "Tom Cantrell".

=== Later career ===
Chantrell's career dwindled from the early 1980s. His portfolio had mostly been built up working on posters for exploitation films, horror movies and British sex comedies, and as these film genres went out of fashion, so too did his style of illustration. As design trends shifted towards computer-based desktop publishing, demand for original artwork for film posters dropped. Chantrell moved into designing cover art for home video titles, but eventually was forced to retire.

In his later years his work found new appreciation with the growing interest in collecting film memorabilia.

== Personal life ==
Tom Chantrell married his first wife, Alice, shortly before the start of his military service in 1940. Together they had two children, Stephen and Sue. In 1962, while he was attending life drawing classes in St Martin's School of Art he met an 18-year-old Chinese student, Shirley How Har Lui. They began a love affair and moved in together in 1965. In 1968, Shirley gave birth to twin daughters, Jacqui and Louise. After nine years, Tom and Alice divorced, and Tom married Shirley.

Chantrell died in hospital aged 84 on 15 July 2001 after suffering a heart attack.

== See also ==
- List of Star Wars artists
- Category:Film posters by Tom Chantrell
