= Howard Terpning =

American painter (born 1927)

- Born: November 5, 1927 (age 98); Oak Park, Illinois, U.S.
- Education: Chicago Academy of Fine Arts; American Academy of Art
- Known for: Painting; Illustration

Howard Terpning (born November 5, 1927) is an American painter and illustrator best known for his paintings of Native Americans.

== Life and career ==
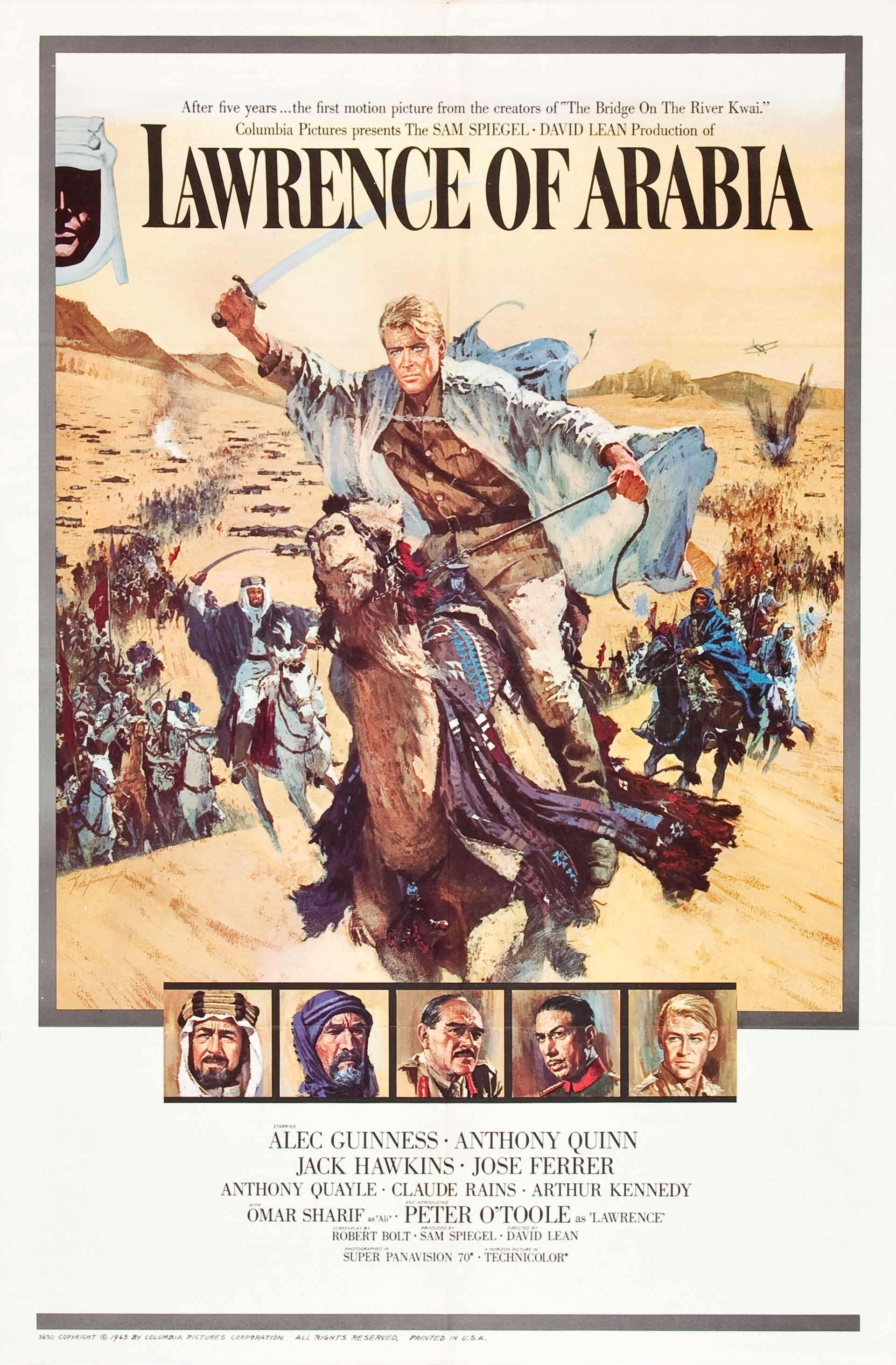
Theatrical release poster by Terpning for the film Lawrence of Arabia (1962)

Terpning was born in Oak Park, Illinois. His mother was an interior decorator, and his father worked for the railroad. He grew up in the Midwest living in Iowa, Missouri, and Texas as well as Illinois. As a boy he liked to draw and knew by the age of seven that he wanted to be an artist. At age 15, he became fascinated with the West and Native Americans when he spent the summer camping and fishing with a cousin near Durango, Colorado. When he turned 17, he enlisted in the Marine Corps and served from 1945 through 1946. He was stationed in China for nine months.

After leaving the Marines he enrolled at the Chicago Academy of Fine Arts in their two-year commercial art program using the G.I. Bill to pay his tuition. To further his study he attended the American Academy of Art in Chicago for six months where he honed his life drawing and painting skills.

After art school a family friend introduced Terpning to Haddon Sundblom, a successful and highly regarded illustrator of that time. Based on the recommendation and the strength of Terpning's drawings, Sundblom hired Terpning to work at his Chicago studio as an apprentice for $35 per week. Initially, Terpning ran errands, cut mats, built crates, and cleaned brushes. After about a year and a half he began to work on his own commissions. In 1955, he moved to a Milwaukee studio where he stayed for three years before relocating to New York where he was hired by a major Chicago studio. By 1962, he was working as a freelance artist using an agent to facilitate the business side of his craft. As a result, Terpning was able to work from his home studio eliminating the long commute into New York City. During 25 years as an illustrator he created magazine covers, story illustrations and advertising art for publications such as Reader's Digest, Time, Newsweek, Good Housekeeping, Field & Stream, McCall's, Redbook, and Ladies' Home Journal.

In addition to illustrating for magazines Terpning completed over 80 movie posters starting with The Guns of Navarone in 1961. Other examples include Cleopatra, Doctor Zhivago, The Sound of Music, The Sand Pebbles, and the 1967 re-release of Gone with the Wind.

In 1967, in the midst of his commercial art career Terpning left his home in Connecticut and headed to Vietnam as a civilian combat artist. He was invited by the Marine Corps to document the war by living with the Marines for one month. After two weeks of training he wound up in Da Nang, South Vietnam, with camera and sketch pad going out on patrols with combat troops. Of the experience Terpning stated he was "profoundly changed" by the experience. Upon his return home he created six paintings which are now at the National Museum of the Marine Corps.

== Fine art ==
Around 1974 Terpning began to tire of commercial work and decided to follow his interest in the American West and Plains Indians. He began to transition into fine art by creating paintings and selling them in Western galleries. The first paintings sold for $2,000 to $2,500. After three years he left Connecticut and the commercial art world and moved to Arizona to devote himself entirely to painting the American West. Within two years he was elected to both the National Academy of Western Art and the Cowboy Artists of America (CA). In the 22 years he was an active member of the CAA, Terpning earned 42 awards for his work.

In 1985, Terpning was honored with a retrospective at the Gilcrease Museum with 38 original works on display. His work has also been displayed in Beijing, China, and the Grand Palais in Paris.

Search for the Renegades (1981)

Descriptions of Terpning's work:

"That Terpning is a realist is plain enough, since his work is primarily representational, not formal. But it is not a realism of minute detail for its own sake, without regard to the context of light and of the subject's character. Nor is it the sort of pop realism that places subjects in happenstance circumstances like tourists with a snapshot camera. Terpning's realism takes for granted the representational nature of art and takes it from there."

"Although his paintings actually read as bold declarations, Terpning's choice of palette is typically restrained in order to ensure that narrative is the first impression imparted upon a viewer."

The late Fred A. Myers, director of Gilcrease Museum said of Terpning, "[he] is simply the best and best-known artist doing Western subjects at this point... He is among a very small group of painters of the West in the late 20th century whose art will still be hanging in museums and appreciated a hundred years from now."

In 2006, at the Coeur d'Alene Art Auction Terpning's Search for the Renegades sold for over $1.4 million, The Stragglers sold for just over $1 million.

Terpning was profiled November 30, 2008, on CBS Sunday Morning.

Terpning's work can be found in museums include the Phoenix Art Museum, National Portrait Gallery, Autry National Center of the American West, Gilcrease Museum, Eiteljorg Museum, Booth Western Art Museum, Tucson Medical Center's Healing Arts Program and The Eddie Basha Collection.

== Awards ==
- Cowboy Artists of America – 42 awards from 1980 to 2002, including 19 gold and 11 artist's choice awards.
- National Academy of Western Art – 7 awards.
- Autry Museum of the American West – 11 awards from 2000 to present.
- Prix De West Show – 2007 Oklahoma Centennial Award
- Eiteljorg Museum – 2001 Eiteljorg Award for excellence in American Western art
- Briscoe Western Art Museum – 2007 1st Governor Brisco Legacy Award
- Marine Corps Combat Artist Hall of Fame – 2008 Inducted
- Nighthorse Campbell Indian Medical Center in Denver, Colorado – 2008 Honored by Native Americans
- Booth Western Art Museum – 2009 Lifetime Achievement Award
- American Academy of Art – 2010 Distinguished Alumnus Award

A more complete and up to date list of awards can be found at the Greenwich Workshop website.

== See also ==
- Bob Peak
- Drew Struzan
- Frank Frazetta
- Frank McCarthy
- Jack Davis
- Richard Amsel
- Steven Chorney
- Saul Bass
- Tom Jung
- The Brothers Hildebrandt
