= Frank McCarthy (artist) =

American painter

Frank C. McCarthy
- Born: March 30, 1924; New York City, New York, U.S.
- Died: November 17, 2002 (aged 78); Sedona, Arizona, U.S.
- Known for: American West art

Frank McCarthy (March 30, 1924 – November 17, 2002) was an American artist and realist painter known for advertisements, magazine artwork, paperback covers, film posters, and paintings of the American West.

== Biography ==
Born in New York City, he studied under George Bridgman and Reginald Marsh at the Art Students League of New York then attended the Pratt Institute in Brooklyn.

== Types of works ==
McCarthy began his art career as a commercial illustrator, opening his own studio in 1948. He did illustrations for most of the paperback book publishers, magazines, including Colliers, Argosy, and True, movie companies, and advertisements.

Among McCarthy's film poster work were The Ten Commandments, Hatari!, Hero's Island, The Great Escape, and with Robert McGinnis, Thunderball, You Only Live Twice and On Her Majesty's Secret Service.

McCarthy left the commercial art world in 1968 in order to concentrate on Western paintings. In 1975 he was invited to join the Cowboy Artists of America. His 1972 painting "The Last Crossing" was used by The Marshall Tucker Band in 1976 for the cover of their fifth studio album, Long Hard Ride. He was inducted into the Society of Illustrators Hall of Fame in 1997.

== Death ==
McCarthy died of lung cancer in 2002 at his home of 30 years in Sedona, Arizona.

== See also ==
- Richard Amsel
- Saul Bass
- Jack Davis
- Frank Frazetta
- The Brothers Hildebrandt
- Tom Jung
- Steven Chorney
- Bob Peak
- Drew Struzan
- Howard Terpning
