= The Mandalorian and Grogu =

2026 Star Wars film by Jon Favreau

Star Wars: The Mandalorian and Grogu
- Theatrical release poster
- Directed by: Jon Favreau
- Written by: Jon Favreau; Dave Filoni; Noah Kloor
- Based on: Characters by George Lucas
- Produced by: Jon Favreau; Dave Filoni; Kathleen Kennedy; Ian Bryce
- Starring: Pedro Pascal; Jeremy Allen White; Brendan Wayne; Lateef Crowder; Jonny Coyne; Martin Scorsese; Sigourney Weaver
- Cinematography: David Klein
- Edited by: Rachel Goodlett Katz; Dylan Firshein
- Music by: Ludwig Göransson
- Production companies: Lucasfilm Ltd.; Fairview Entertainment
- Distributed by: Walt Disney Studios Motion Pictures
- Release dates: May 14, 2026 (TCL Chinese Theater); May 22, 2026 (United States)
- Running time: 132 minutes
- Country: United States
- Language: English
- Budget: $165 million
- Box office: $345.8 million

Star Wars: The Mandalorian and Grogu (titled The Mandalorian and Grogu on-screen) is a 2026 American science fiction film directed by Jon Favreau, who co-wrote the film with Dave Filoni and Noah Kloor. Produced by Lucasfilm and Fairview Entertainment, and distributed by Walt Disney Studios Motion Pictures, it is part of the Star Wars franchise and serves as a continuation of the Disney+ television series The Mandalorian (2019–2023). Pedro Pascal stars as Din Djarin / The Mandalorian—who was also portrayed on set by Brendan Wayne and Lateef Crowder—alongside Jeremy Allen White, Jonny Coyne, Martin Scorsese, and Sigourney Weaver with supporting roles from Stephen McKinley Henderson, Hemky Madera, Shirley Henderson, and Steve Blum. In the film, which is set following the fall of the Galactic Empire, Djarin and his apprentice Grogu are enlisted by the New Republic to rescue Rotta the Hutt (White) in exchange for information on a target.

Favreau and Filoni wrote a fourth season of The Mandalorian by February 2023, but production was delayed by the 2023 Hollywood labor disputes. During this time, Lucasfilm re-evaluated their plans for the franchise and decided to prioritize a Mandalorian film over the fourth season. The Mandalorian and Grogu was announced in January 2024 with Favreau directing and co-writing with Filoni and Kloor, and Pascal reprising his role from the series. Filming began in California by August 2024 and was completed by that December, with large segments of it filmed in IMAX. Further casting was revealed around and after filming, including the return of various characters from The Mandalorian and other Star Wars media. The Mandalorian composer Ludwig Göransson returned to score the film.

Star Wars: The Mandalorian and Grogu premiered on May 14, 2026, at TCL Chinese Theatre in Los Angeles, and was released in the United States on May 22. It grossed $345.8 million worldwide, which did not meet Disney's expectations, becoming the lowest-grossing live-action Star Wars film. The film received mixed reviews, with critics praising the score, action sequences, and Pascal's performance while criticizing the plot, script, and visuals.

== Plot ==
Mandalorian bounty hunter Din Djarin, known as Mando, and his foundling Grogu, work for the New Republic to hunt down neo-imperialist warlords of the former Galactic Empire. After a successful mission, Mando is tasked by New Republic commander Ward to find the mysterious warlord Commander Coin. The New Republic has been offered intel on his whereabouts by the Hutt Twins, siblings and successors to the deceased crime-lord Jabba, in exchange for rescuing Jabba's son and heir Rotta from the moon Shakari. Mando reluctantly accepts the assignment, and receives a new Razor Crest ship as pre-payment.

Upon arriving at Shakari, Mando discovers that Rotta is a popular gladiator in a fighting pit owned by crime-lord Janu. Rotta, desperate to step out of Jabba's shadow, enjoys his status as a self-made fighter and refuses to be rescued by Mando, saying that his next fight will repay his debt to Janu and set him free. Mando tracks Janu down and offers to buy Rotta's freedom, but Janu refuses, intending for Rotta's final fight to be a match in which he will continue fighting monsters until death. Mando returns to Rotta, who refuses to believe him, instead calling on security. Mando is subdued and must fight Rotta in the arena. He defeats Rotta, but surrenders rather than killing him. He tells Janu that this fight has fulfilled Rotta's debts, and that Janu must now set him free. Realizing that his plan has been thwarted, Janu floods the arena with monsters, forcing Mando and Rotta to work together to defeat them. Rotta breaks the arena's security systems, which sets the surviving monsters free, before escaping. Aided by Zeb Orrelios, Mando and Grogu pursue and capture Rotta.

Rotta claims that the Twins only want him so they can kill him, preventing him from potentially claiming control over the Hutt Cartel. When Mando explains that he needs to give Rotta to the Twins in exchange for Coin's whereabouts, Rotta tells him that Janu and Coin are the same person. Trusting Rotta, Mando and Zeb raid Janu's compound and bring him back to Ward, who takes him in for questioning but warns that the Twins will not take kindly to Mando's breaking his promise to deliver Rotta to them. Mando returns to Nevarro with Grogu. He enlists four Anzellans to modify the Razor Crest and helps Rotta go into hiding via a gunrunner. At night, Mando and one Anzellan are captured by bounty hunter Embo, who delivers him to the Twins on Nal Hutta; Grogu and the other Anzellans follow.

Mando is brought before the Twins, who have intercepted Rotta and are intending to slowly torture him for hundreds of years. To punish Mando for breaking his contract, the Twins remove his helmet and drop him into a pool of water which houses Amanin and the giant Dragonsnake. Defeating the Amanin, Mando recovers his helmet and escapes with the help of Grogu and the Anzellans, but is mortally envenomated by the Dragonsnake in the process. Unable to fit aboard the small Anzellan ship, Mando stays behind on Nal Hutta, holding off his pursuers to cover Grogu and the Anzellans' escape as he succumbs to the venom. Grogu also chooses to stay behind, tending to the dying Mando and eventually saving his life using an antidote made by a friendly fisherman. Mando, now fully recovered, decides to go after the Twins instead of fleeing Nal Hutta, reasoning that they would still pursue him and Grogu.

Mando and Grogu break into the Twins' palace using the gunrunner ship and battle their way through their droid security force, before being intercepted by Embo. Mando duels Embo while Grogu frees Rotta, who fights the Twins; the fight eventually drops himself, the Twins, and Embo into the Dragonsnake pit. Grogu saves Rotta with the Force while Embo escapes through the tunnel Grogu created earlier, leaving the Twins to be eaten alive by the Dragonsnake. The Anzellans return, bringing Ward and a New Republic squadron with them, to destroy the Twins' palace and droids.

Ward confirms Mando's suspicions that Janu and the Twins were working together, and Rotta chooses to stay and work with the New Republic. Mando and Grogu leave in the Razor Crest, where Mando teaches Grogu how to pilot it.

== Cast ==
- Pedro Pascal as Din Djarin / The Mandalorian:
  A Mandalorian and veteran bounty hunter in the outer reaches of the galaxy, whose face is often hidden by a helmet. Pascal said the film was the start of a new chapter after the end of The Mandalorian's third season (2023), which saw Djarin agree to work for the New Republic. Pascal said this gave the character a chance to combine his bounty hunter skills with doing "what he knows is right" by working for "the good guys". After the third season showed Djarin paying penance for removing his helmet, which goes against the Mandalorian creed, the film unmasks the character again. Director Jon Favreau said they did not make this decision lightly and were balancing the established story with their wish to show more of Pascal's face. Pascal felt the unmasking was justified in the film.
  - Brendan Wayne and Lateef Crowder as the on-set doubles for the Mandalorian
- Grogu:
  The Mandalorian's ward, who is an infant of the same species as Yoda. Grogu is created with animatronics and puppetry, augmented with visual effects. Producer Kathleen Kennedy said the character was a "perfect example of a character that has to emote and you have to feel connected to" without hearing him speak.
- Jeremy Allen White as Rotta the Hutt:
  The son of deceased crime lord Jabba the Hutt. White provides the voice for Rotta, speaking in Galactic Basic (represented by English) and Huttese. He took inspiration from Jabba's voice in previous Star Wars media. Unlike previous Hutts, Rotta is a physical threat who participates in gladiator-style fights. Favreau compared him to Adonis Creed from the Creed films, saying both characters live in the shadow of their famous fathers.
- Jonny Coyne as Janu Coin: A Shakari crime lord and the leader of a faction of Galactic Empire remnants
- Martin Scorsese as Hugo Durant: An Ardennian fry cook on Shakari that Mando visits twice for information
- Sigourney Weaver as Ward: A colonel and leader of the New Republic's Adelphi Rangers who previously served as a pilot for the Rebel Alliance

Additionally, Steve Blum reprises his role from previous Star Wars media as the voice of New Republic pilot Garazeb "Zeb" Orrelios, while the Kyuzo bounty hunter Embo appears in a mostly non-speaking role. Other returning Star Wars characters include members of the Anzellan species, all voiced by Shirley Henderson, and Jabba the Hutt's twin cousins, voiced by unspecified actors. Stephen McKinley Henderson provides the voice of Gatori, a fisherman on Nal Hutta that Grogu encounters. Hemky Madera portrays the Imperial warlord Commander Barro, and Matthew Willig portrays Coin's henchman Hogsbreth.

Briefly appearing in the film as New Republic X-Wing pilots are the film's co-writer Dave Filoni and Paul Sun-Hyung Lee as Trapper Wolf and Carson Teva, both reprising their roles from previous Star Wars media, alongside The Mandalorian series directors Deborah Chow, Rick Famuyiwa, and Lee Isaac Chung as Sash Ketter, Jib Dodger, and Dok Suri, respectively. Lucasfilm's Vice President and Creative Director and the film's production designer Doug Chiang appears as New Republic member Lieutenant Blick. Anthony Daniels, who played C-3PO in previous Star Wars films, has a voice cameo as an air traffic control droid.

== Production ==
=== Background ===
Director Jon Favreau had pitched an idea for a Star Wars television series featuring Mandalorians to Lucasfilm president Kathleen Kennedy in 2017. Dave Filoni, an executive producer on the animated series Star Wars: The Clone Wars (2008–2020) and Star Wars Rebels (2014–2018), was also conceiving a Mandalorian-focused series and Kennedy suggested they work together. This led to the creation of The Mandalorian, the first live-action Star Wars television series, which debuted with the launch of the streaming service Disney+ in November 2019. Shortly after the premiere, Walt Disney Studios's chief creative officer (CCO) Alan F. Horn said a film featuring the titular bounty hunter, Din Djarin, could be developed if the series was a success. The next month, Favreau said there was an opportunity to explore the series' characters in Star Wars films or spin-off television series.

The Mandalorian's bounty at the start of the series is "the Child", colloquially known as "Baby Yoda" by viewers, who is an infant of the same species as Yoda. The character is created with animatronics and puppetry, augmented with visual effects. He becomes the Mandalorian's ward, and is revealed in the second season to be named Grogu. In September 2020, The Mandalorian co-star Giancarlo Esposito said the second season lays the groundwork for "the depth and breadth that's going to come in season three and season four". The next month, Favreau and star Pedro Pascal said they were open to the Mandalorian appearing in a Star Wars film, but Favreau was in no rush to do this. Favreau began writing the fourth season by late May 2022, and completed the scripts with Filoni by February 2023. Filming for the season was scheduled to begin that September, but this was delayed by the 2023 Hollywood labor disputes. In November, Filoni revealed that he was now the CCO at Lucasfilm and would be directly involved in the planning of future films and series.

=== Development ===
While production on the fourth season was delayed by the labor disputes, Lucasfilm re-evaluated their plans for the franchise and decided to prioritize a Mandalorian film instead. The studio announced the film, titled The Mandalorian and Grogu, in January 2024. Favreau was set to direct, co-write with Filoni, and produce with Kennedy, Filoni, and Ian Bryce. Noah Kloor also contributed to the script after co-writing the spin-off series The Book of Boba Fett (2021–22) and an episode of The Mandalorian with Favreau. Filming was expected to begin in June 2024, making it the first Star Wars film to move forward since Star Wars: The Rise of Skywalker (2019) ended the main "Skywalker Saga" film series. Pascal celebrated the film's announcement by sharing concept art for it on Instagram. He was expected to reprise his role as the voice of the Mandalorian, but it was unclear whether he would be physically portraying the character—whose face is generally hidden with a helmet—and some questioned whether his busy schedule had room for the production.

It was unclear at the time of the film's announcement whether the fourth season would still be made because there was potential for future Mandalorian stories to instead be told through film sequels if the first film was a success. Favreau later said he still had all the scripts for the fourth season and the film had become "more of its own thing" due to the changes needed to fit a film structure rather than that of a weekly television series. James Whitbrook at Gizmodo said the existence of scripts for a fourth season did not mean one would be made, and if the season did get made it was unclear whether re-writes would be necessary to work around the film. Favreau said the planned fourth season would have featured many characters, was centered on Grand Admiral Thrawn and the larger storyline of this era of Star Wars, and would have set up the events of the second season of Ahsoka. He reiterated that changing from a television series to a film forced him to create a new story, though he was still able to explore the idea of Grogu being the Mandalorian's apprentice and some references to the wider universe which had been planned for the fourth season. Favreau said the film's story is less reliant on material from the previous seasons to accommodate audiences who had not watched the series. Jonny Coyne, who appeared in the third season of The Mandalorian as the Imperial Warlord Janu, said he was originally slated to appear in multiple episodes of the planned fourth season before Favreau approached him to appear in the film; he was confirmed to be appearing in the film in December 2024.

During an earnings call in February 2024, Disney CEO Bob Iger said the film would likely be released in 2026 and would start a new slate of Star Wars films. Explaining the decision to move forward with The Mandalorian and Grogu as the next Star Wars film, Kennedy said they had built an audience for the film through the success of The Mandalorian on Disney+ and she believed young audiences would consider the film to be "their Star Wars" and not feel pressure to watch the entire franchise to see this entry. Filoni—who later replaced Kennedy as co-president of Lucasfilm—said The Mandalorian and Grogu did not have the same pressure as Star Wars: The Force Awakens (2015), which was similarly the first Star Wars film in years, because it was not the start of a new trilogy or introducing new characters. He described the film as a "big celebration" of the title characters.

Also in February 2024, California allocated the production $21,755,000 in tax credits from the state's filming tax incentive program, one of the biggest allocations in the program's history. The film was expected to be entirely produced in the state, a first for a Star Wars theatrical film, and would generate over $166 million in qualified expenditures and below-the-line wages there. In April, Disney scheduled the film for release on May 22, 2026, filling the May 2026 date that the studio previously reserved for an untitled Star Wars film. Sigourney Weaver was in talks to join the cast a month later. Production designers Doug Chiang and Andrew L. Jones returned from The Mandalorian and its spin-offs, while costume designer Mary Zophres reunited with Favreau after working on his film Cowboys & Aliens (2011).

=== Filming ===
Principal photography was scheduled to begin in June 2024 in California, under the working title Thunder Alley, and was expected to last for 92 days. The film had approximately 54 cast members, 3,500 background extras, and 500 crew members. David Klein returned as cinematographer from the third season of The Mandalorian, while Filoni and The Mandalorian director Peter Ramsey directed the second unit. Favreau and Filoni said in early August that filming had begun several weeks earlier. At that time, the character Garazeb "Zeb" Orrelios from Rebels was revealed to be appearing along with the Anzellan species from The Rise of Skywalker, after both appeared in The Mandalorian's third season. A new version of the Razor Crest, the Mandalorian's ship that was destroyed in the second season, was also set to appear. Weaver confirmed her casting at the end of August. Favreau and Filoni said the action, spectacle, and practical effects would be expanded from the series, but they felt the characters connecting with audiences was more important. Around 49 minutes of the film was shot in the full-frame 1.43:1 IMAX aspect ratio. Filming wrapped by the start of December.

=== Post-production ===
Rachel Goodlett Katz edited the film, after working on the third season of The Mandalorian. In mid-December 2024, Jeremy Allen White was cast to provide the voice of Rotta the Hutt, a character first introduced in the animated film Star Wars: The Clone Wars (2008). At Star Wars Celebration Japan in April 2025, Weaver was revealed to be portraying New Republic colonel Ward, while Filoni was revealed to be reprising his role as New Republic pilot Trapper Wolf from The Mandalorian. The film's official trailer, released in February 2026, confirmed that Steve Blum was reprising his role as the voice of Zeb, Martin Scorsese was providing the voice of an Ardennian shopkeeper, The Clone Wars character Embo would appear, and Jabba the Hutt's twin cousins from The Book of Boba Fett would also be returning. Tippett Studio provided stop motion animation for the film. The film features opening credits, a first for a Star Wars film.

== Music ==
Ludwig Göransson was confirmed in September 2025 to be composing the score for the film, returning to the franchise after composing for the first two seasons of The Mandalorian and providing themes for the third. Scoring sessions took place during the first half of January 2026 at the Fox Studio Lot in Los Angeles. A soundtrack album featuring Göransson's score was released digitally by Walt Disney Records on May 15. A 12-inch vinyl album with 13 cues from the soundtrack will be released on June 5, and a special edition 10-inch vinyl in the shape of the Mandalorian's helmet, featuring two new score cues, was released on May 22.

== Marketing ==
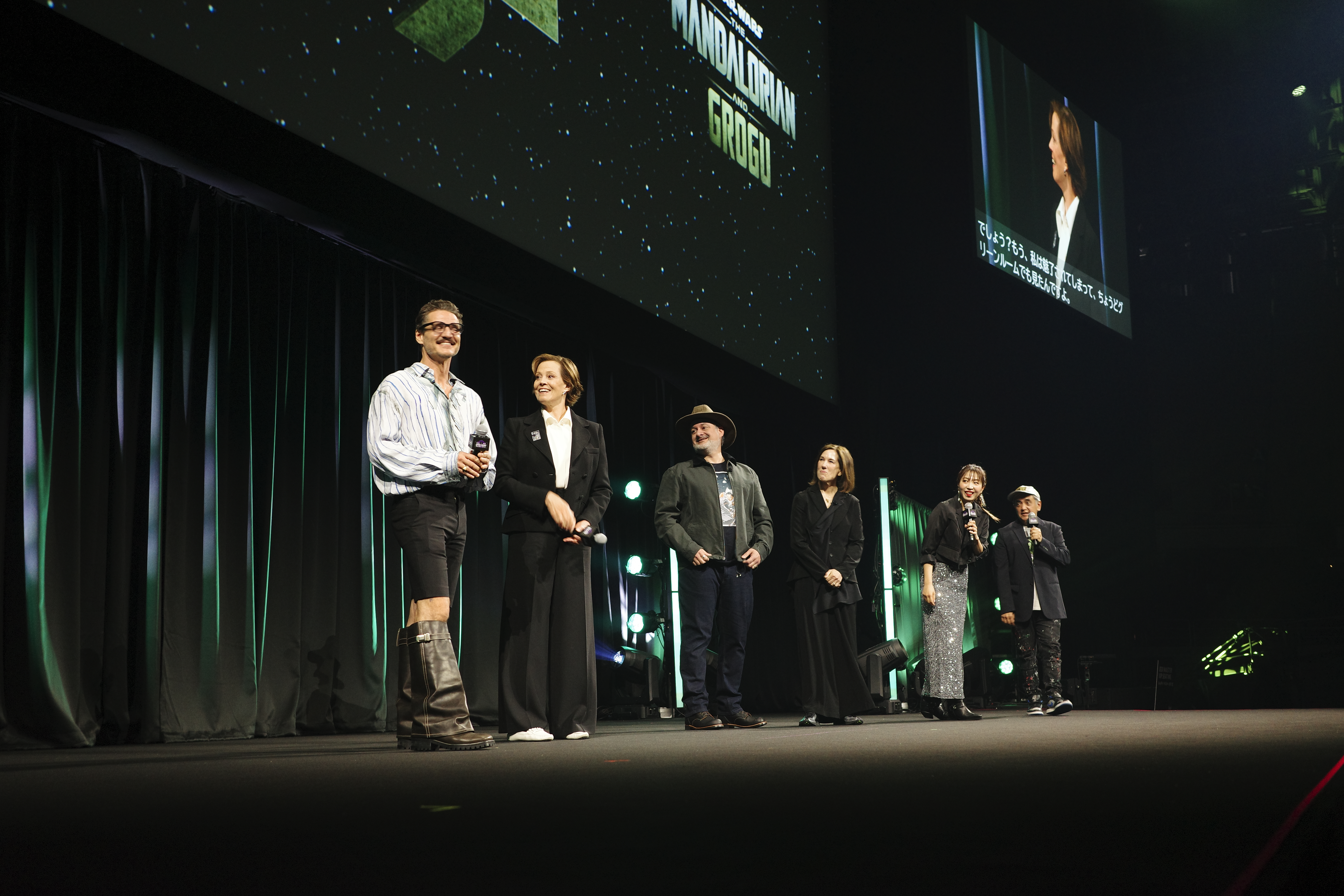
Pedro Pascal, Sigourney Weaver, Dave Filoni, and Kathleen Kennedy promoting the film at Star Wars Celebration Japan in April 2025

Favreau and Filoni presented initial footage from the film at Disney's D23 convention in August 2024. More footage was shown at D23 Brazil that November, with Favreau and Filoni appearing via a video message from the film's set. A panel for the film was held at Star Wars Celebration Japan in April 2025, where more footage and first-look photos were shown. Favreau, Filoni, Kennedy, Pascal, and Weaver discussed the film and were joined on stage by an animatronic Grogu.

A teaser trailer was released online in late September 2025. It was originally planned to be released the previous week, but was repeatedly delayed amid Disney's controversial decision to suspend its ABC late-night talk show Jimmy Kimmel Live! The teaser's release before the suspension was resolved led to comments from fans and commentators who believed it was being used by Disney to distract from the controversy. Matt Patches at Polygon said the teaser should have felt like a "massive event" but instead felt like Disney was attempting a Jedi mind trick. Discussing the teaser for The Verge, Andrew Webster said it made the film look like a combination of the "adventurous vibe of the original trilogy and the cuteness" of The Mandalorian, while Polygon's Michael McWhertor said it "promises lots of action". James Hibberd at The Hollywood Reporter said the teaser was a "different vibe for a Star Wars film, and feels very lighthearted and family friendly". He noted the focus on Grogu and the fact that only one human face (Weaver) is clearly seen among creatures, droids, and masked characters. Also writing for The Hollywood Reporter, Richard Newby said the teaser and other early marketing had not distinguished the film from the series and left some questioning why a fourth season had not been made instead. While Newby praised The Mandalorian, he believed a theatrical Star Wars film should feel different from watching a Disney+ series.

A television spot was released during Super Bowl LX, showing Din Djarin and Grogu riding on a wagon pulled by tauntauns with a voice over by Sam Elliott. The spot is a parody of classic Budweiser Super Bowl ads featuring the Budweiser Clydesdales. Lucasfilm's marketing team felt this was a unique and creative way to pay tribute to past Super Bowl ads while reminding audiences "of the fun, heart, and spectacle that defines Star Wars". Omar L. Gallaga, writing for the Los Angeles Times, ranked it ninth in a list of the best Super Bowl LX ads and said it was clever to copy the style of the Budweiser ads. Gallaga stated, "Even if you're not that excited about seeing Baby Yoda on the big screen, you can't deny that this ad sure felt like it belonged on the Super Bowl." Eric Diaz at Nerdist described the spot as wholesome and adorable, comparing it to a Christmas card. Other responses were less positive, and there was confusion about why a parody spot was released instead of an actual trailer. Ryan Scott and Pauli Poisuo at /Film called it "the worst Star Wars spot we've ever seen", while Polygon's Aimee Hart was disappointed and bored by it and felt Lucasfilm and Disney should have made a greater effort to promote the film during the Super Bowl. James Whitbrook at Gizmodo was confused about the film's overall marketing campaign. He said the series' marketing had always relied on "vibes" over giving away specific plot details, and the film's marketing had been consistent with that, but questioned whether that approach made sense for the first Star Wars film in years. A few months from the film's release, he said the marketing had yet to justify why audiences should see the film in theaters and why a fourth season was not being made instead.

The official trailer was released online in mid-February. Multiple commentators expressed relief to finally have a full look at the film. Whitbrook said the trailer "still keeps its cards close to its chest, [but] it certainly gives us a bigger look at what to expect" from the film. Moments that were commonly highlighted include the reveal that Din Djarin would be unmasked, showing Pascal's face; the appearance of Embo; and the casting of Scorsese, with Patches discussing Scorsese's history of public comments regarding blockbuster films and suggesting that his casting in this film was an attempt to find "common ground" with blockbuster fans. Favreau promoted the film at CinemaCon in April, debuting the final trailer and showing the first 17 minutes of the film to attendees. The trailer was released online soon after. Whitbrook said the final trailer was a "much better look at the film than anything we've had before", noting the action shots and the use of John Williams's themes from the previous Star Wars films. Den of Geek's Joe George said the film could be a "crowd-pleaser, finally washing away the stink" of The Rise of Skywalker, if Favreau was able to bring together all the different elements shown in the trailer. He highlighted the return of the Anzellans, as did William Hughes at The A. V. Club who named them and Weaver as selling points for casual viewers who were not already fans of The Mandalorian. Later in April, Pascal and Favreau made surprise appearances at CCXP Mexico and showed the film's opening minutes.

In May 2026, Disney posted a video to social media of Pascal dressed as the Mandalorian and surprising Star Wars fans at the Star Wars: Galaxy's Edge themed area of Disneyland in California. This received negative responses online when it was discovered that the group of fans featured in the video were all Star Wars content creators and influencers that had been invited to the event by Disney. Hibberd reported that the group were genuine fans with small social media followings who did not know that Pascal would be meeting them, and that Pascal, Weaver, Favreau, and Filoni also spent time with everyday tourists at the park after the stunt was filmed. From May 5, 2026, Star Wars: Galaxy of Heroes launched the season "Era of the New Republic" based on the film featuring characters from the film and The Mandalorian series. The film's marketing, along with its production budget, was reported to be $300 million.

== Release ==
=== Theatrical ===
Star Wars: The Mandalorian and Grogu premiered on May 14, 2026, at TCL Chinese Theatre in Los Angeles, and was released in the United States on May 22, in IMAX, 3D, 4DX, and ScreenX, among other premium large formats (PLFs).

=== Home media ===
Star Wars: The Mandalorian and Grogu was released for digital download on July 21, 2026, before releasing on 4K Ultra HD, Blu-ray, and DVD on August 25. It was released on the streaming service Disney+ on September 2.

In the United Kingdom, the film debuted at No. 1 on the Official Film Chart for the week ending July 29, ahead of The Super Mario Galaxy Movie and Disclosure Day. In the United States, The Mandalorian and Grogu topped Fandango at Home's weekly digital sales and rental chart for the week ending July 26, following its premium digital release on July 21. On physical media, it was the best-selling film for the week ending August 29, according to Circana's VideoScan tracking service, which compiles DVD and Blu-ray sales.

Nielsen Media Research, which records streaming viewership on certain U.S. television screens, reported that The Mandalorian and Grogu was the second most-streamed film from August 31 to September 6, with 727 million minutes viewed. The following week, from September 7–13, the film recorded 366 million minutes of watch time, playing third. Between September 14–20, The Mandalorian and Grogu recorded 159 million minutes of watch time, ranking sixth. TVision, which tracks viewer attention, program reach, and engagement across more than 1,000 CTV apps, announced that it was the thirteenth most-streamed film in the United States through October 2026.

== Reception ==
=== Box office ===
The Mandalorian and Grogu grossed $177.7 million in the United States and Canada and $168.1 million in other territories for a total of $345.8 million worldwide. Disney CEO Josh D'Amaro said that the film did not meet their box office expectations, but by investing in the film and franchise, they were able to "fuel other parts of our company" such as retail, theme park admissions, and "significant engagement" in gaming.

In the United States and Canada, The Mandalorian and Grogu was projected to gross around $82 million from 4,300 theaters in its four-day opening weekend, including 425 IMAX theaters. This projection was the lowest of any Star Wars title released by Disney since their 2012 acquisition of Lucasfilm. Globally, it was anticipated that the film would earn at least $160 million.

The film made $33 million during its opening day, including $12 million from Thursday night previews, after which the projections for its opening weekend were increased to $91–96 million. Following a more subtle Friday box office, the film would make a rebound at the box office after making major gains in its Saturday box office numbers. Across the four-day opening weekend, the film opened to $98.1 million with $81.7 million over the traditional three-day weekend. Despite topping the box office, this marked the lowest opening for a live-action film in the Star Wars franchise, breaking the previous low set by Solo: A Star Wars Story in 2018.

The film dropped to third place during its second weekend, behind newcomer Backrooms and Obsession, grossing $25 million. This marked a 70% decline, the worst second weekend-drop for a Star Wars film. In its third weekend, the film had another drop, this time of 60%, falling out of the top 5 at the box office by grossing $10 million and finishing the weekend with $293 million worldwide.

The performance of The Mandalorian and Grogu at the box office was partly attributed to the franchise's established presence on Disney+. TheWrap noted that the success of The Mandalorian as a streaming property may have reduced the "urgency" for audiences to see its theatrical continuation, after years of being accustomed to watching the series at home as part of a monthly subscription. The article also noted that the series had broader demographic appeal than many other Star Wars properties, reaching both younger and older viewers while having a narrower gender gap, and suggested that this broad appeal, while valuable for streaming, may not necessarily create the same sense of urgency associated with more event-driven theatrical releases. However, TheWrap also described the film's theatrical release as part of a broader Disney monetization strategy, arguing that the company's goal lies in "retaining subscribers, dominating platform demand, and selling millions of dollars in Grogu merchandise."

=== Critical response ===
On the review aggregator website Rotten Tomatoes, 61% of 332 critics' reviews are positive, with an average rating of 5.8/10. The website's critics consensus reads: "Bountiful in action but threadbare in narrative thrust with its episodic structure, this Star Wars is more of a skirmish that coasts on the charm of its central dynamic duo." Metacritic, which uses a weighted average, assigned the film a score of 53 out of 100, based on 53 critics, indicating "mixed or average" reviews. Audiences polled by CinemaScore gave the film an average grade of "A−" on an A+ to F scale, while 71% of those surveyed by PostTrak said they would definitely recommend the film.

Critics were divided on the film, calling it fun yet weak and predictable. Pascal's performance, Grogu, action sequences and the score were highlighted, while the plot, script and visuals were criticized. Giovanni Lago of Next Best Picture said, "Nothing about The Mandalorian and Grogu feels worthy of gracing IMAX screens," criticized Pascal's performance as half-hearted, and said Allen White "is also not given much to work with in his dialogue". Germain Lussier of Gizmodo said the film "doesn't tell a vital story that pushes the characters or series into new territory". Clarisse Loughrey of The Independent said, "With just five minutes of Pedro Pascal and a completely dispirited voice performance from Jeremy Allen White as Jabba the Hutt's son, this is the dullest and most inconsequential Star Wars ever made."

Writing for Consequence, Liz Shannon Miller gave it a "B" and stated that "there have been some exciting new stories told in this universe since The Rise of Skywalker, but watching this latest installment of Lone Wolf and Cub in space just confirms the degree to which Star Wars feels like it's spinning its wheels." Peter Bradshaw of The Guardian said, "there isn't enough of the humanity, humour and extravagant space melodrama which has made and continues to make Star Wars lovable." Frank Scheck of The Hollywood Reporter said it "feels stubbornly small in its relatively inconsequential storyline and themes." Tom Jorgensen of IGN said the film seems like "it's laser-focused on catering to people who have only heard about the show."

Sergio Burstein of the Los Angeles Times wrote that while he personally found CGI distracting, the film won its audience over by using it on non-human creatures and on ships. Burstein noted that while some of the backgrounds looked unrealistic, he highlighted that the film had "genuinely pleasing visual moments". Writing for Radio Times, Patrick Cremona called the film a "diverting romp with some fun scenes and a few endearingly touching moments".

=== Accolades ===
At the 2026 Golden Trailer Awards, the "Hope" trailer was nominated for Best Original Score, Best Fantasy/Adventure, and Best Summer 2026 Blockbuster Trailer.
