= Abe Peck =

American writer and editor

- Born: January 18, 1945 (age 81); Bronx, New York
- Education: New York University
- Occupations: Author, Professor

Abe Peck is a magazine consultant, writer, editor and professor, known for having been an editor and writer at the Chicago Seed underground newspaper from 1968 to 1971.

== Biography ==
=== Early life and education ===
Peck was born in the Bronx, New York on Jan 18, 1945. He graduated from New York University with a degree in history and pursued graduate studies before dropping out of school and into New York's East Village.

=== Chicago Seed ===
In 1967, he landed in Chicago, where, after driving a company car to the March on the Pentagon, he began writing for the Seed. He became editor soon afterward, and led the paper toward the Yippies (Youth International Party), a group that planned surrealistic-oriented events for the 1968 Democratic Convention. Despite a split with Abbie Hoffman and Jerry Rubin over tactics and transparency, he and other Seed staffers appeared in Lincoln Park throughout the demonstrations.

The paper was known for its colorful printing, artwork and comix.

"Covers ... favored bold images that told a bigger story instead of everyday photos ('Everyone knew what Vietnam and the military looked like,' says Peck). The inside could be just as striking, featuring poster-size pullouts with Day-Glo ink, gradient backgrounds, a wealth of major-label music ads, and intricate drawings.”

While supporting various movements, the Seed remained independent of organizational affiliation. "Although the paper was far left-leaning, it was known for its independence and impartiality on left-wing issues, not subscribing to a particular ideology, which was unusual for the time.” Eventually, however, the Seed grew increasingly radical and Peck left the paper in 1970.

=== Later career ===
Freelance writing led to an associate editorship at Rolling Stone magazine, where he edited, wrote features and edited the book Dancing Madness." In 1977, he returned to Chicago and worked as a feature writer, section editor, and weekly columnist at The Chicago Daily News and then The Chicago Sun-Times. He went on to write for magazines from Outside to GQ.

Since 2019, he has been editor and now editor at large of Inside Unmanned Systems (insideunmannedsystems.com), which covers the autonomous vehicle space. He previously served as a Master Series Contributing Editor for Travel Weekly.

He is a principal in the firm Peck Consultants, for which he has performed more than 100 audits of magazines in various publishing platforms.

=== Teaching ===
In 1980, Peck began a career as a professor at the Medill School of Journalism at Northwestern University. He held two named chairs and various departmental positions, as well as the founding directorship of the National Arts Journalism Program. He also earned tenure, in part for authoring the book Uncovering the Sixties: The Life and Times of the Underground Press. According to WorldCat, the book is held in 562 libraries. He has contributed to several other books.

In 2008, Peck assumed emeritus status and moved to Santa Barbara, California, but remains the school's Director of Business to Business Communication. He co-edited Medill on Media Engagement with Edward Malthouse.

== Awards and honors ==
In 2026 and 2022, Peck and his team at Inside Unmanned Systems won Jesse Neal awards for best single issues in its revenue category. Peck has been honored with a lifetime achievement award in 2008 from ASBPE, the business-to-business editors association, and was recognized as professor of the year in 2003 by the magazine division of AEJMC, the Association for Excellence in Journalism and Mass Communication. He is a member of the Chicago Journalism Hall of Fame and is on the board of California Humanities.

== Personal life ==
Peck is married to Suzanne Peck, and has two sons, Rob Peck, a digital marketer and Doug Peck, a music director.
