= Doug Chiang =

American film designer and artist

- 江道格
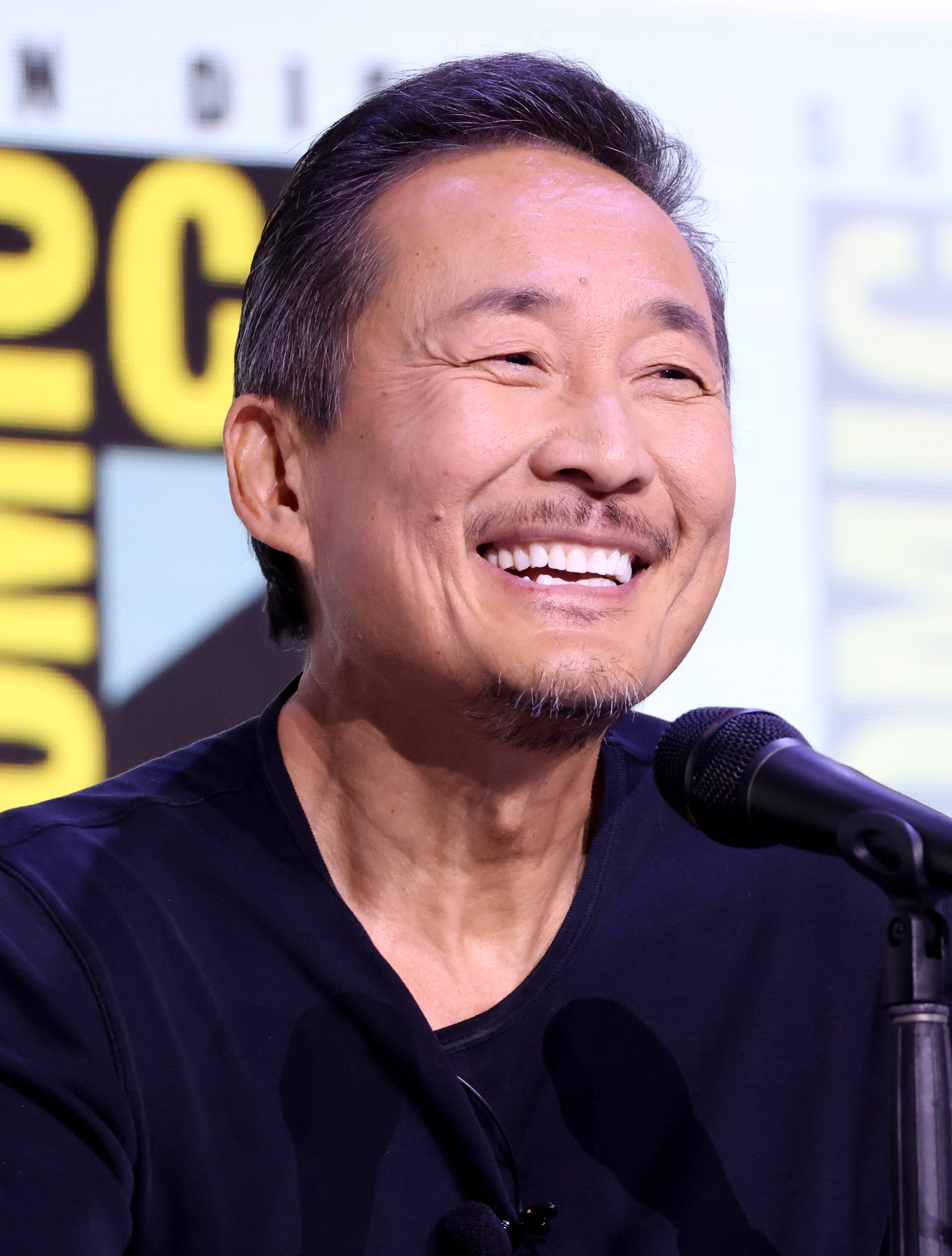
- Chiang in 2025
- Born: February 16, 1962 (age 64); Taipei, Taiwan
- Education: College for Creative Studies; University of California, Los Angeles (BFA)
- Occupation: Film designer
- Years active: 1990–present
- Employer: Lucasfilm (1995–present)
- Title: Vice President and Creative Director at Lucasfilm

Doug Chiang (Chinese: 江道格; born 16 February 1962) is an American film designer and artist. He is vice president and executive creative director of Lucasfilm, where he has worked since 1995.

== Early life and education ==
Chiang was born in Taipei, Taiwan. His dad went to Michigan in the United States for college, and moved the family to Dearborn, Michigan when Chiang was 5 years old. His parents encouraged him to assimilate into American culture by speaking more English, which Chiang described as one of the ways the family tried to fit in. Chiang therefore lost his ability to speak Chinese over the years. Nonetheless, he characterized his lifestyle as "still very culturally Chinese", citing the strong work ethic imposed by his parents.

Chiang was inspired by the original Star Wars film and the accompanying art design book. He studied industrial design at the College for Creative Studies until 1982. He later studied film production at the University of California, Los Angeles, and graduated in 1986. During his time in college, he was an illustrator and art director for the Daily Bruin and involved with the Association of Chinese Americans.

== Career ==
During the late 1980s, he worked at various production studios including Rhythm and Hues. Chiang eventually joined Industrial Light & Magic as a creative director where he worked on films such as James Cameron's Terminator 2: Judgment Day (1991) and Robert Zemeckis' Forrest Gump (1994). In 1995, he was hired to lead Lucasfilm's art department; he was the design director for George Lucas' Star Wars: Episode I – The Phantom Menace (1999) and Episode II – Attack of the Clones (2002). Afterwards, he was a production designer on Zemeckis' The Polar Express. Outside of film, he collaborated with author Orson Scott Card on an illustrated science-fiction book called Robota.

He founded DC Studios in 2000 with his creation, Robota, as a primary project. Along with Sparx Animation Studios in Ho Chi Minh City, he created several animated shorts depicting the world of Robota in action.

In 2004, Chiang co-founded Ice Blink Studios and worked for Zemeckis on Beowulf. Ice Blink closed in 2007, becoming the core of the facility for ImageMovers Digital, a pioneering performance capture animation studio.

Chiang returned to the Star Wars franchise as the concept artist for The Force Awakens as well as production designer for Rogue One. His other Star Wars includes the films Solo and The Rise of Skywalker, and the television series The Mandalorian and Obi-Wan Kenobi.

== Awards ==
Chiang has won numerous awards throughout his career. His accolades include an Academy Award and a BAFTA for Death Becomes Her, a BAFTA for Forrest Gump, a FOCUS Award for his independent film Mental Block, a Clio Award for his work on a Star Wars campaign and The BrandLaureate Award.

== Works ==
=== Films ===
- Ghost (1990) (visual effects art director: ILM)
- The Doors (1991) (visual effects art director: ILM)
- Switch (1991) (visual effects art director)
- Terminator 2: Judgment Day (1992) (visual effects art director: ILM)
- Death Becomes Her (1992) (visual effects art director: ILM)
- Forrest Gump (1994) (visual effects art director: ILM)
- The Mask (1994) (visual effects art direction supervisor)
- Jumanji (1995) (visual effects art director: ILM)
- Star Wars: Episode I – The Phantom Menace (1999) (design director, visual effects production designer: ILM)
- Star Wars: Episode II – Attack of the Clones (2002) (concept design supervisor)
- The Polar Express (2004) (production designer)
- War of the Worlds (2005) (concept artist)
- Monster House (2006) (concept design supervisor)
- Beowulf (2007) (production designer)
- A Christmas Carol (2009) (production designer)
- Mars Needs Moms (2011) (production designer)
- Star Wars: The Force Awakens (2015) (concept artist)
- Rogue One: A Star Wars Story (2016) (production designer)
- Solo: A Star Wars Story (2018) (head of design)
- Star Wars: The Rise of Skywalker (2019) (head of design)
- The Mandalorian and Grogu (2026) (production designer)

=== Television ===
- The Mandalorian (2019–present) (design supervisor, art director)
- Obi-Wan Kenobi (2022) (design supervisor)

=== Books ===
- Robota (2003) (co-Writer, illustrator)
- Mechanika: Creating the Art of Science Fiction with Doug Chiang (2008, 2015) (writer, illustrator)
- Star Wars Art: Concepts (Star Wars Art Series) (2013) (introduction, concept artist)
- The Art of Star Wars: The Force Awakens (2015) (concept artist)

=== Video games ===
- Card Soldier Wars (2008) (artist)
- The Looking Glass Wars Card Game (2009) (artist)

== See also ==
- Taiwanese art
