= Brothers Hildebrandt =

American brothers illustrator duo

The Brothers Hildebrandt
- Born: Greg and Tim Hildebrandt; January 23, 1939; Detroit, Michigan, U.S.
- Died: Tim Hildebrandt: June 11, 2006 (aged 67) New Brunswick, New Jersey, U.S. Greg Hildebrandt: October 31, 2024 (aged 85) Denville Township, New Jersey, U.S.
- Education: Meinzinger Art School
- Occupation: Illustrators
- Notable work: The Lord of the Rings; Star Wars film poster; Magic: The Gathering; The Sword of Shannara
- Awards: Lifetime Chesley Award (Greg); World Fantasy Award for Best Artist (Tim)
- Website: Official website

Greg (January 23, 1939 – October 31, 2024) and Tim Hildebrandt (January 23, 1939 – June 11, 2006), known as the Brothers Hildebrandt, were American twin brothers who worked collaboratively as fantasy and science fiction artists for many years, produced illustrations for comic books, movie posters, children's books, posters, novels, calendars, advertisements, and trading cards.

== Career ==
Born in Detroit, Michigan, Greg and Tim Hildebrandt studied at the Meinzinger Art School, and began painting professionally in 1959 as the Brothers Hildebrandt. The brothers both held an ambition to work as animators for Walt Disney, and although they never realized this dream, their work was heavily influenced by the illustration style of Disney feature films such as Snow White, Pinocchio and Fantasia. They were also influenced by the artwork in comic books and science fiction books, notably the work of Norman Rockwell and Maxfield Parrish.

The brothers are best known for their popular The Lord of the Rings calendar illustrations, illustrating comics for Marvel Comics and DC Comics, original oil paintings for a limited edition of Terry Brooks's The Sword of Shannara, and their Magic: The Gathering and Harry Potter illustrations for Wizards of the Coast.

Illustration of the Fellowship of the Ring by the Brothers Hildebrandt for the 1976 Tolkien Calendar. Their approach to the challenge of illustrating Tolkien prompted John Howe to become a Middle-earth artist.

The Hildebrandts' Style "B" quad poster for the UK release of Star Wars (1977)

In 1977 the brothers were approached by 20th Century Fox to produce poster art for the UK release of Star Wars. A promotional poster had already been produced in the US by the artist Tom Jung, but Fox executives considered this poster "too dark". The Brothers Hildebrandt had established a reputation working on the Lord of the Rings calendar and a concept poster for Young Frankenstein, and Fox commissioned them to rework the image. The twins had to work to a very tight deadline, and worked together in shifts to produce a finished product in 36 hours. Their version of the poster, referred to as Style "B", was distributed to be used on British cinema billboards for the UK release, and became possibly their best known work. Using the same layout as Jung's Style "A" poster, it depicts the character of Luke Skywalker standing in a heroic pose brandishing a shining lightsaber above his head, with Princess Leia standing below him, and a large, ghostly image of Darth Vader's helmet looming behind them. The central figures are surrounded by smaller depictions of other characters and a montage of starfighters in combat amid a sea of stars. Both Jung and the Hildebrandts had worked on their posters without reference to photographs of the actual cast, and Fox and Lucasfilm later decided that they wanted to promote the new film with a less stylized and more realistic depiction of the lead characters. Producer Gary Kurtz commissioned the film poster artist Tom Chantrell to paint a new version from film stills and publicity photos. Star Wars opened in British theatres on December 27, 1977, and the Hildebrandts' poster continued to be used until late January 1978, when it was replaced by Chantrell's Style "C" poster.

Despite their strong associations with the works of J. R. R. Tolkien, the brothers were not given a role in the production of Ralph Bakshi's animated version of The Lord of the Rings (1978), which was a source of disappointment for them. In 1981, the Hildebrandts had another film poster commission, for the Greek mythological heroic fantasy film Clash of the Titans. Together, the brothers developed a concept for a fantasy movie, Urshurak; although this never went into production, the Hildebrandts collaborated with author Jerry Nichols to publish Urshurak in the form of an illustrated fantasy novel in 1979.

The lack of success with Urshurak may have contributed to their decision to work independently of each other, and in 1981 the brothers began to pursue separate careers. Greg painted cover artwork for the magazines Omni and Heavy Metal, and illustrated a number of books including Mary Stewart's Merlin Trilogy, The Wonderful Wizard of Oz, Aladdin, Robin Hood, Dracula, and The Phantom of the Opera. Tim also created cover art for books such as The Time of the Transference and The Byworlder, as well as for Amazing Stories magazine, along with illustrated calendars based on fantasy themes such as Dungeons & Dragons. After 12 years the Brothers reunited to collaborate on work for Marvel Comics, Stan Lee, and numerous book projects.

Greg Hildebrandt Jr. also made major contributions to the production of a book entitled Greg & Tim Hildebrandt: The Tolkien Years, which gave an overview of the Tolkien genre artworks produced by Greg and Tim in the 1970s.

Brothers Hildebrandt artwork for Lord of the Rings is featured in the Magic: The Gathering collectible trading card game as borderless cards.

=== Greg's solo work and family ===
Individually, Greg contributed to the art for the Trans-Siberian Orchestra's albums and concert merchandise. He also provided the cover art for Black Sabbath's 1981 Mob Rules album. He started his American Beauties pinup art in 1999. In 2019, it was announced that Greg would provide cover art for a new series of Star Trek comics, Star Trek: Year Five, from IDW Publishing. This was the first time that Greg had worked on the Star Trek franchise.

During the 1980s and 1990s Greg illustrated a number of classic books. These range from Greg Hildebrandt's Favorite Fairy Tales, Alice in Wonderland, Peter Cottontail's Surprise, Peter Pan and Robin Hood to Dracula, Poe: Stories and Poems and The Phantom of the Opera. During this time Greg also illustrated the holiday books Christmas Treasury and Treasures of Chanukah.

In April 2022, Greg was reported among the more than three dozen comics creators who contributed to Operation USA's benefit anthology book Comics for Ukraine: Sunflower Seeds, a project spearheaded by editor Scott Dunbier whose profits would be donated to relief efforts for Ukrainian refugees resulting from the February 2022 Russian invasion of Ukraine. Greg, who joined the project in its second week, explained his reasons for contributing thus: "Neither Jean nor I ever expected to live long enough to see Russia attack any country simply out of greed. The savagery we have witnessed in these past weeks is beyond anything we can fathom. Our hearts break for the people of Ukraine. The loss of life is stunning. The monstrously evil insanity of Putin's War is equal to the Turks attempt to exterminate the Armenians in WWI and Hitler's attempt to exterminate the Jews in WWII. Any project that I can lend my art to that will thwart Putin is a project I will join with all my heart, soul and mind."

Greg married his first wife, Diana F. Stankowski, in 1963. Diana assisted in his art projects and was the model for Princess Leia on the Star Wars movie poster. They had two daughters and a son. In 1991 Greg began living with longtime colleague Jean Scrocco. The couple married in 2009. Greg died on October 31, 2024, at the age of 85.

=== Tim's solo work and family ===
Tim Hildebrandt illustrated children's books, two Dungeons & Dragons calendars, and the poster for the 1982 film The Secret of NIMH; his art was also used in advertising by AT&T and Levi's.

Tim was associate producer of the 1983 horror-themed science fiction film The Deadly Spawn, filmed in Tim and Rita's Victorian home in Gladstone.

Tim married Rita Murray, who went on to design and create the costumes for the Lord of the Rings works. Together they had a son. Tim Hildebrandt died on June 11, 2006, at the age of 67, due to complications of diabetes.

== Awards ==
Tim won the 1992 World Fantasy Award for Best Artist. Both were awarded the Inkpot Award in 1995. In 2010 Greg Hildebrandt received the Chesley Award for Lifetime Artistic Achievement from the Association of Science Fiction and Fantasy Artists. Together, the brothers were awarded the gold medal by the Society of Illustrators.

== Legacy ==
Terrence Brown, Director of the Society of Illustrators, describe the brothers as "more than a footnote in the history of American illustration. [They] are the long chapter ... [They are among] the roots of popular culture."

== See also ==
- List of Star Wars artists
- Category:Star Wars (film franchise) posters

== Sources ==
- Lambiek Comiclopedia profiles
