= Tom Jung =

American artist

- Born: Thomas Jung; Boston, Massachusetts, U.S.
- Education: School of the Museum of Fine Arts
- Known for: Art direction, graphic design, illustrator, storyboard artist
- Notable work: Doctor Zhivago; Gone with the Wind (re-issue); Papillon; The Man Who Would Be King; The Omen; Star Wars; The Lord of the Rings; The Deer Hunter; The Empire Strikes Back; Raging Bull; Once Upon a Time in America
- Awards: Key Art Award 1978, 1980; The International Society of Science Fiction Award, 1978

Thomas Jung is an American art director, graphic designer, illustrator, and storyboard artist. He is known for his movie poster art.

== Biography ==
=== Early life and career ===
Jung, a Chinese American, was raised and educated in Boston, Massachusetts. After finishing high school, he attended the School of the Museum of Fine Arts. During his second year he was drafted into the Army. While stationed at Fort Jackson in Columbia, South Carolina, Jung contributed to the newspaper Fort Jackson Leader as an editorial cartoonist, designing and illustrating primarily public service communications.

Following his discharge, he worked as a freelance illustrator and art director with a number of well known advertising agencies in New York.

In 1958 Jung was hired full-time to redesign advertisement campaigns of foreign films to suit American audiences (theatrical redistribution) for Ben Adler Advertising Services Inc. Jung created pressbooks (exhibitor's campaign manuals) and one sheets for distribution to independently owned movie theaters throughout the country, including La Strada and And God Created Woman.

Jung's early work is typified by caricature art for movies such as Confessions of Felix Krull, The Captain from Köpenick, The Golden Age of Comedy and Murder Ahoy. His one-sheet art for the film School for Scoundrels is perhaps the best example of that early style, displaying caricatures in shades of black and gray on a white background with distinctive handlettering. The look recalls Jung's own early aspirations of becoming a Mad Magazine cartoonist in the style of such artists as Jack Davis, Mort Drucker and Jack Rickard.

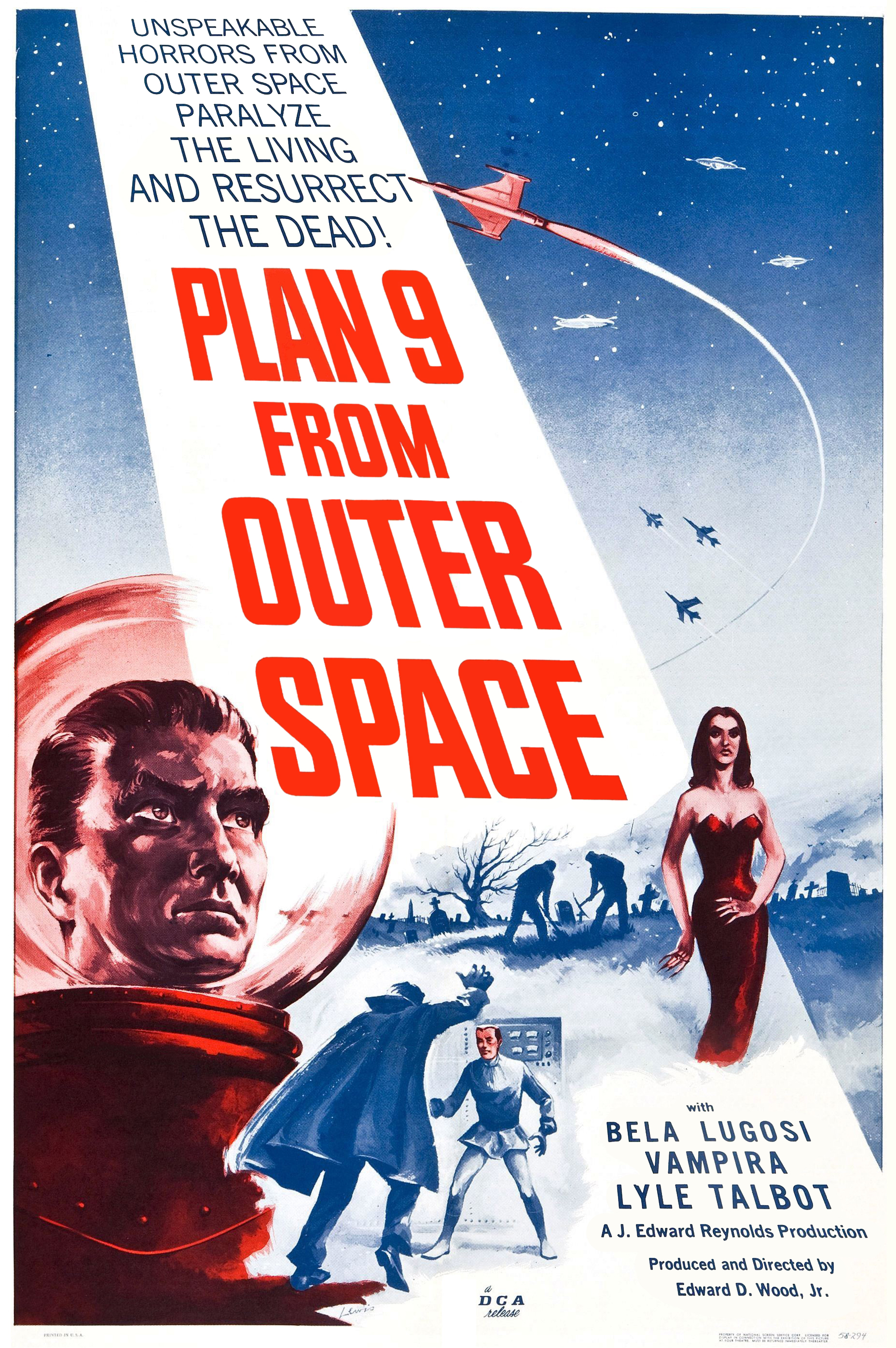
Plan 9 from Outer Space, 1959

Jung's early successes led eventually to his role as freelance art director in 1963 at Metro-Goldwyn-Mayer, where he designed posters for roadshow or "hard-ticket" movies such as Dr. Zhivago, Grand Prix, Far from the Madding Crowd, Ice Station Zebra, and The Shoes of the Fisherman. The design process at MGM involved developing multiple poster concepts, carefully rendered in pencil or charcoal with or without copy lines and credits in position. These "layouts" were then presented to and scrutinized by ad manager Bill O'Hare and marketing vice president Dan Terrell for approval as the films' key art. Once selected, this concept would be the one to appear in newspapers, magazines and in-house stationery, PR communications, all interior and outdoor posting material for distribution in the United States.

Upon final review by MGM chief executive officer Robert O'Brien, the concept was turned over to their advertising agency account executive, Lloyd McKean, to manage implementation. Art Director Burt Kleeger would task the agreed-upon illustrator to prepare a full color painting of the approved image as well as to design various needed parts of the campaign. The advertising agency art department would then prepare "mechanicals" to precise dimensions for the engravers and plate makers for newspaper, magazine and poster printers.

Gone with the Wind (re-release), 1967

Jung selected Howard Terpning to illustrate his concept art for the 1967 re-release of Gone with the Wind. Taking a cue from the original movie poster art, Jung's iconic pose is often imitated, most notably in the style A poster for The Empire Strikes Back. "I see the results of my design all over," he said. "Gone with the Wind was really notable for its schmaltziness."

In 1968, Jung was engaged by Bill O'Hare, now a marketing executive at CBS television network's theatrical film division Cinema Center Films, to handle the art direction for their entire release schedule of nearly 30 films. Some of the films Jung designed and illustrated, with the help of able staffer and artist Vincent Marrone, were A Man Called Horse, Little Big Man, Prime Cut, and Le Mans, starring Steve McQueen.

=== Later career ===
In 1973, Jung's work on the movie Papillon "was the first major break that pushed him into the big-bracket category". "It was obvious that Dustin Hoffman and Steve McQueen had unique roles in Papillon," he recalled. "Steve represented, at that time, a gut of defiance that any person would identify with ... defiance against oppression and authority. The poster made with this theme merged perfectly with the mood of the film." An auction profile for the original art gives a synopsis of Jung's concept: "Accomplished in acrylic on a leaf of 17 x 18 ¼ in. artist's illustration board it features the defiant, squinting profiles of Steve McQueen and Dustin Hoffman. Jung commented that although he was a trained illustrator, for 20 years he had acted as art director for ad campaigns and concepts, and not practicing his painting. The present concept study was his first effort to establish a style and was approved by Marketing VP Ed Seigenfeld (Allied Artists, 1973)."

During this time Jung was known to film studios as a one stop shop for advertising. He was handed a project and given full discretion to develop the concept, design and illustration including copy lines and title logos. Jung worked for Allied Artists, United Artists, Columbia Pictures, 20th Century Fox, Paramount Pictures and Lucasfilm Ltd. designing key art concepts and illustrating movie posters for films including The Man Who Would Be King, The Deer Hunter, Dr. Zhivago, and Apocalypse Now.

Jung often collaborated with Nelson Lyon, a former Saturday Night Live writer and the creator of the 1971 movie The Telephone Book, to develop copy lines. Jung's unique title logos for movies such as The Sand Pebbles, Super Fly, Gold and The Omen tie-in key elements that distill down the essence of the films into key art.

Star Wars, Style A, 1977

As a freelance illustrator in 1977 working for the motion picture advertising boutique of Smolen, Smith and Connolly, Jung was chosen to work on Star Wars. He was given the theme of "Good Over Evil," and provided with a wealth of photos taken by unit photographers in color and black & white, as well as 2.25-inch stills on contact sheets taken from the original 35mm print of the film. Jung's work was used as the one sheet "style A" theatrical poster for the film's advertising campaign. According to Jung, the unlikely "cross" formed by Luke Skywalker's saber sword set against the ghosted background image of Darth Vader seemed to him like a good solution to the "good" versus "evil" theme. The poster also featured a notable title logo from Jung, mimicking the film's famed opening crawl.

A stylistic progression in Jung's art is clear from his 1978 work on The Lord of the Rings. One of two concepts submitted, the one sheet depicting Gandalf and the Hobbits Frodo and Sam is rendered in a style markedly different from Jung's other works. In his own words: "There's probably a lot of posters I've done that people aren't aware of: Papillon, The Man Who Would Be King, and ... for Lord of the Rings." Jung's poster won first prize for Best Graphic Award in 1978 from the International Society of Science Fiction, Horror and Fantasy, and has been called "truly the most well-remembered image" from the film.

Regarding his 1980 work on The Empire Strikes Back, Jung recalled: "I used various martial arts attitudes in my working studies, trying to come up with the perfect look. I was searching for the image 'bi-coastal' (as they used to say) of Darth Vader, which could be the centerpiece for The Empire Strikes Back. I made the presentation to Sid Ganis at Lucasfilm's new offices in North Hollywood, near Universal Studios. In the large airy reception area sitting on couches, with my presentation spread on a coffee table, we attracted a small crowd of onlookers. Steven Spielberg peered in and chimed, 'I like that' and strolled away. It was the drawing of Darth Vader in profile, a powerful outstretched arm holding his saber."

In 1981 Jung was contacted by Sid Ganis, vice president of marketing at Lucasfilm, to develop concept sketches for Raiders of the Lost Ark. At the same time the production company, Paramount Pictures along with advertising agency Diener/Hauser/Bates, were working with another illustrator, Richard Amsel, to also develop a marketing campaign. Jung created sixteen concept sketches for the one-sheet, one of which was approved to go to color. Borrowing from his original Papillon artwork, Jung used a "brown sauce" palette and a unique concept to create the iconic character Indiana Jones for his interpretation of the movie's key art.

After many months of back and forth between competing concepts it was decided that Richard Amsel's would be used as the one-sheet for the campaign. The decision was partly based on the view that the character Indiana Jones should not be shown with a gun. In Jung's art, a gun and a whip were both prominently held by Indiana Jones. Jung's concept, though not used during the film's advertising campaign, is preserved in the Lucasfilm archives.

Starting in 1997 with the Disney film Jungle 2 Jungle, Jung began working on the production side of the business as a storyboard artist. His ability to draw without the use of visual aids, in a manner similar to that of a comic book artist, made his transition to storyboard art unproblematic. Jung's films as a storyboard artist include The Perfect Storm, The Salton Sea, and Disturbia.

== Creative process ==
An interview on the design and illustration of the 1974 poster The Man with the Golden Gun, Jung elaborated on his creative process: "The actual painting is done on 20x30 double-weight illustration board, half of a standard 30×40 board. I used acrylics, I can use it transparently or opaquely; it dries quickly and is permanent and can be reworked. I'd use airbrushing for large areas of background, color pencils, and inks and dyes and tempera and whatever else I think that may give me the desired result. Sandpaper. Brillo. A single-edge razor blade. Whatever works." Jung often used family members as models. For the Star Wars poster design, with Frank Frazetta in mind as his final illustrator, Jung posed his son Jeff as Luke Skywalker and his wife Kay as Princess Leia. After discussions with Don Smolen of Smolen, Smith and Connolly, it was decided that Jung would execute the illustration.

Jung has said he believes he does not have a recognizable technique: "I adjust my technique to the problem at hand, because being an art director in advertising it's really the end result that I'm after ... anything to get the printed poster and the printed ad, which is the primary goal".

== Select illustrations and graphic design ==
Date	Project	Notes
1954	La Strada	US release, Pressbook including one-sheet
1955	Death of a Cyclist	US release (Age of Infidelity), Pressbook including one-sheet
1956	Liane, Jungle Goddess	US release, Hand lettering design and illustration
1956	The Captain from Koepenick	US release, Pressbook including one-sheet
1956	The Sword and the Cross	US release, Pressbook including one-sheet
1957	And God Created Woman	US release, Key Art
1957	Confessions of Felix Krull	US release, Pressbook including one-sheet
1957	Monpti	US release (Mon Petit), Pressbook including one-sheet
1957	The Golden Age of Comedy	Eileen Schutz Artist
1957	The Prince and the Showgirl	Key Art
1958	Cat on a Hot Tin Roof	
1958	Yankee Doodle Dandy	Re-Release, Pressbook including one-sheet
1959	Go, Johnny Go!	Pressbook including one-sheet
1958	Hippodrome	Pressbook including one-sheet
1959	Plan 9 from Outer Space	Pressbook including one-sheet, David Lewis Artist
1959	Room at the Top	Pressbook including one-sheet
1960	Day of the Painter	Promotional Marketing Campaign
1960	School for Scoundrels	
1961	Anna's Sin	
1963	Murder at the Gallop	
1963	The Day and the Hour	US Release
1963	The Wheeler Dealers	Key Art
1964	Murder Ahoy	
1964	Murder Most Foul	
1964	The Big Parade of Comedy	
1964	The Outrage	Sanford Kossin Artist
1964	The Unsinkable Molly Brown	Promotional Record Album
1964	The Young Lovers	
1965	Lady L	Robert McGinnis Artist
1965	Doctor Zhivago	Howard Terpning Artist
1966	Grand Prix	Howard Terpning Artist
1966	Hotel Paradiso	Frank Frazetta Artist
1966	The Sand Pebbles	Graphics design one-sheet, Original Soundtrack and opening credits
1967	Far from the Madding Crowd	Howard Terpning Artist
1967	Gone with the Wind (re-release)	One-sheet, Original Soundtrack. Howard Terpning Artist
1967	The Venetian Affair	Frank McCarthy Artist
1967	Tony Rome	Teaser Poster
1968	Ice Station Zebra	Howard Terpning Artist
1968	Mayerling	
1968	The Shoes of the Fisherman	Howard Terpning Artist
1969	The Royal Hunt of the Sun	Howard Rogers Artist
1970	A Man Called Horse	Vincent Marrone Artist
1970	Scrooge	Joseph Bowler Artist
1970	Kelly's Heroes	Jack Davis Artist
1971	Le Mans	
1972	Prime Cut	
1972	Super Fly	One-sheet, Original Soundtrack
1972	The Little Ark	Arthur Lidov Artist
1972	The Revengers	
1973	Papillon	One-sheet, Original Soundtrack
1973	White Lightning	
1974	Gold	
1974	Huckleberry Finn	David Blossom Artist
1974	The Day of the Dolphin	
1974	The Man with the Golden Gun	
1974	The Spikes Gang	
1974	The Towering Inferno	
1975	Bite The Bullet	Style A and B
1975	Brannigan	Robert McGinnis Artist
1975	Lucky Lady	
1975	Report to the Commissioner	
1975	The Man Who Would Be King	One-sheet, Original Soundtrack
1975	The Old Gun	
1975	Smile	Key Art
1976	Bound for Glory	Style A and B, Original Soundtrack
1976	Burnt Offerings	
1976	Shout at the Devil	
1976	The Omen	Teaser, Co-designer Murray Smith. Style F and Original Soundtrack
1977	March or Die	
1977	Star Wars	Style A poster designer (later adapted as Style B by Brothers Hildebrandt), Half-sheet, Re-releases 1979, 1981, 1982, 1997 Trilogy designer, Original Soundtrack back cover and promotional poster.
1978	F.I.S.T.	Key Art
1978	The History of Country Music	Commercial use, Distributed to radio stations. Poster and album cover.
1978	The History of Rock and Roll	Commercial use, Distributed to radio stations. Poster and album cover.
1978	King of the Gypsies	Style A and B, Sanford Kossin Artist Style B
1978	The Deer Hunter	Saul Cooper Initial Concept
1978	The Great Train Robbery	
1978	The Greek Tycoon	David Blossom Artist
1978	The Lord of the Rings	Style A and B
1978	Who'll Stop the Rain	
1979	Apocalypse Now	Co-designer, Bob Peak Artist
1980	Heaven's Gate	
1980	Raging Bull	Style B, Co-artists Kunio Hagio and Paul Gross
1980	The Dogs of War	
1980	The Empire Strikes Back	Style B and re-releases 1981, 1982
1980	The Formula	One-sheet, Original Soundtrack
1981	Raiders of the Lost Ark	Key Art
1981	Whose Life Is It Anyway	
1983	Return Of The Jedi	Re-release 1985, One sheet with Death Star exploding
1983	Scarface	Key Art
1983	The Right Stuff	One-sheet, Original Soundtrack
1984	Dune	Designer
1984	Once Upon a Time in America	Artist Syle A, B and C. U.S. and foreign advertising campaigns
1984	The Buddy System	
1984	The Razor's Edge	
1985	Sylvester	
1985	Weird Science	Duane Meltzer Artist
1986	Clockwise	Duane Meltzer Artist
1986	Heat	Key Art
1987	Flowers in the Attic	Co-designer Nelson Lyon
1988	Pass the Ammo	Co-designer Ken Goodman
1989	Moontrap	
1989	The Iron Triangle	
1991	Star Trek 25th Anniversary	
1991–1993	The Thrawn Trilogy	Book Cover Art – Heir to the Empire, Dark Force Rising, The Last Command, Promotional Poster
2012	Wallenda	Shawn Hull Artist

== Select storyboard artwork ==
The key skill: "One thing a storyboard artist needs to be able to do is be able to draw out of his head. There are many illustrators who have to rely on photographs, but unless you can draw out of your head like comic book artists, I don't think you can do it. ... Normally, a storyboard artist is only called in when they are looking for special effects or action shots. But sometimes you have a guy like Alfred Hitchcock, he wouldn't even trust the camera and he would visualize every single shot."

— Tom Jung in the Los Angeles Times, 2007

Date	Project
1977	The Baron
1996	Mrs. Santa Claus (Trailers)
1996	Ransom (Trailers)
1997	Jungle 2 Jungle
1997	The Relic (Trailers)
1998	Chairman of the Board (Trailers)
1998	Dr. Dolittle
1999	My Favorite Martian
1999	Stuart Little
2000	The Adventures of Rocky and Bullwinkle
2000	Nutty Professor II: The Klumps
2000	The Perfect Storm
2001	Hannibal (Trailers)
2002	Collateral Damage
2002	Frank McKlusky, C.I.
2002	Master Spy: The Robert Hanssen Story
2002	Slackers
2002	Star Trek: Nemesis
2002	Stuart Little 2
2002	The Salton Sea
2003	The Haunted Mansion
2003	Looney Tunes: Back in Action
2003	Hulk
2003	Holes
2003	Just Married
2004	First Daughter
2004	Scooby-Doo 2: Monsters Unleashed
2004	Starsky & Hutch
2005	Herbie: Fully Loaded
2005	Two for the Money
2005	Underclassman
2006	Zoom
2007	Disturbia
2007	Blades of Glory
2012	Wallenda

== Awards ==
- The International Society of Science Fiction, Horror and Fantasy, "Best Graphic Award", 1979, Lord of the Rings
- Key Art Award, Tom Jung, designer, illustrator, "El Francotirador": (The Deer Hunter) Latin America, Third Place, 1980
- Key Art Award, Creating and illustrating The Golden Years of Country, 1978

== See also ==
- List of Star Wars artists
- John Alvin
- Richard Amsel
- Saul Bass
- Tom Chantrell
- Steven Chorney
- Jack Davis
- Frank Frazetta
- The Brothers Hildebrandt
- Frank McCarthy
- Bob Peak
- Drew Struzan
- Howard Terpning
