= TV Guide (magazine) =

American magazine

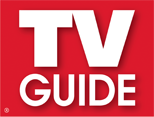
- Editor-in-Chief: Michael P. Fell
- Categories: Entertainment news
- Frequency: Biweekly
- Circulation: 938,780
- Founder: Lee Wagner; Mark Brenner
- Founded: 1948 (entered as second class mailer August 10, 1948, at P.O. New York City)
- First issue: April 3, 1953; 73 years ago
- Company: TV Guide Magazine LLC (NTVB Media)
- Country: United States
- Based in: New York City
- Language: English
- Website: tvguidemagazine.com
- ISSN: 0039-8543
- OCLC: 5593691

TV Guide is an American bi-weekly magazine that provides television program listings information as well as television-related news, celebrity interviews and gossip, film reviews, crossword puzzles, and, in some issues, horoscopes. The print magazine's operating company, TV Guide Magazine LLC, is owned by NTVB Media since 2015. The magazine was spun off from TV Guide in 2008 by then-owner Macrovision to OpenGate Capital for $1 and a $9.5 million loan.

TV Guide Magazine has a license to use the TV Guide name and distinctive red and white logo in print publications only; it is prohibited from using the branding or logo online. While the TV Guide trademark and other intellectual property is owned by Fandom, Inc., the TV Guide name and editorial content from the magazine are licensed by Fandom for use on the magazine's promotional website and mobile app.

== History ==
=== Prototype ===
The prototype of what would become TV Guide magazine was developed by Lee Wagner (1910–1993), who was the circulation director of MacFadden Publications in New York City in the 1930s – and later, by the time of the predecessor publication's creation, for Cowles Media Company – distributing magazines focusing on movie celebrities.

In 1948, he printed New York City area listings magazine The TeleVision Guide, which was first released on local newsstands on June 14 of that year. Silent film star Gloria Swanson, who then starred of the short-lived variety series The Gloria Swanson Hour, appeared on the cover of the first issue. Wagner later began publishing regional editions of The TeleVision Guide for New England and the Baltimore–Washington area. Five years later, he sold the editions to Walter Annenberg, who folded it into his publishing and broadcasting company Triangle Publications, but remained as a consultant for the magazine until 1963.

=== Annenberg/Triangle era ===
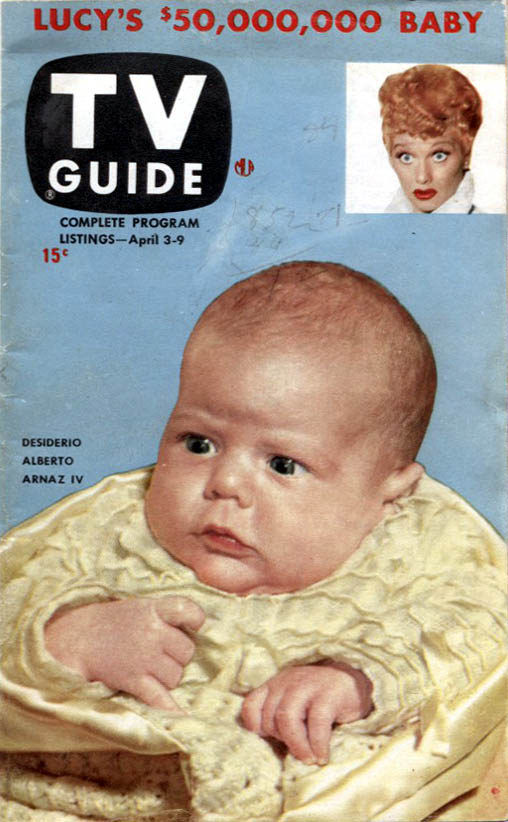
The first issue of TV Guide (April 3, 1953), featuring Desi Arnaz Jr., the younger child of Lucille Ball (seen at upper right inset)

Triangle publications Inc. was inherited by Walter H. Annenburg from his father (Moses L. Annenburg 1878-1942) in 1942, and Annenburg Jr subsequently developed the magazine TV guide.The first national issue of TV Guide was released on April 3, 1953, with a circulation of 1,560,000 copies in ten U.S. cities. The inaugural cover featured a photograph of Lucille Ball's newborn son, Desi Arnaz, Jr., with a smaller inset photo of Ball in the corner under the headline: "Lucy's $50,000,000 baby". The magazine was printed in digest size, a format it kept for 52 years. From its debut until July 2–8, 1954, listings ran Friday through Thursday. The July 9–16 issue ran Friday through Friday. Beginning July 17–23, 1954, issues ran Saturday through Friday, a format kept until April 2004.

TV Guide grew out of Triangle Publications’ purchase of several local listings magazines, including TV Forecast (first published May 9, 1948, in Chicago, the first continuously published television listings magazine), TV Digest (in Philadelphia and Pittsburgh, originally called The Local Televiser), and the New York-based Television Guide (renamed TV Guide on March 18, 1950). Each of these cities became part of TV Guide's initial rollout.

The launch was an immediate success, but circulation soon declined even as the magazine expanded to Pittsburgh, Rochester, Detroit, Cleveland and San Francisco. By mid-August 1953, sales had fallen 200,000 below the first issue. The September 4–10, 1953, "Fall Preview" issue reversed the trend, selling 1,746,327 copies. Circulation then grew steadily, and by the 1960s TV Guide was the most widely read magazine in the United States. The cover price was 15¢ (equivalent to $1.81 in 2025; by as of 2014, it was $4.99). In addition to subscriptions, TV Guide was sold in grocery store checkout lanes nationwide. Until the 1980s, feature stories were also advertised in television commercials. Under Triangle, TV Guide became recognized as the leading authority on television, publishing articles—most in the color section—by staff and contributing writers.

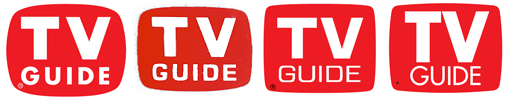
Past logos used by the publication (l–r): 1953–1962, 1962–1968, 1968–1987 and 1987–2003.

The TV Guide logo evolved with the television screen itself. It shifted to a widescreen style in September 2003 and a flatscreen style in September 2016. Slightly different versions are used for the magazine and for the CBS-managed digital properties. Early logos had backgrounds in various colors until the red background became standard in the 1960s, though special editions sometimes varied.

The magazine was first based in a small Philadelphia office, then moved in the late 1950s to larger headquarters in Radnor, Pennsylvania. The facility housed management, editors, production staff, subscription processors, and a computer system cataloging every show and movie. Printing of the national color section—containing articles and reviews—was done at Triangle's Gravure Division plant, next to the Inquirer Building on North Broad Street. This section was then sent to regional printers to be combined with local listings.

Triangle Publications also owned The Philadelphia Inquirer, the Philadelphia Daily News, ten radio and six TV stations (including WPVI-TV in Philadelphia, WTNH in New Haven, Connecticut, and KFSN-TV in Fresno, California), as well as The Daily Racing Form, The Morning Telegraph, Seventeen, and cable interests. WFIL-TV, under Triangle, launched American Bandstand, which made Dick Clark a major television personality. Triangle sold its Philadelphia newspapers to Knight Newspapers in 1969 and its broadcast stations in the early 1970s to Capital Cities Communications (later acquired by ABC). It retained TV Guide, Seventeen, and The Daily Racing Form.

TV Guide emphasized original copywriting, often based on screenings and interviews, rather than reusing material from broadcasters. For its first 52 years, the magazine’s program listings appeared in a “log” format: a text-based list of programs organized by start time and channel. This remained the sole method of presenting program information until national listings were introduced in 2005. When prime time grids were later added, the log became the primary, and in its final two years the secondary, display method. The log format allowed full program titles and included synopses for movies and most shows. Most entries also listed program genres (and for national news programs, the anchor) after the title. Running time was included only if a program lasted at least one hour (later, 35 minutes), shown in hours and minutes within the synopsis.

Channel numbers appeared at the start of each entry in a round icon (“bullet”), later modified into a TV screen shape resembling the ‘‘TV Guide’’ logo. In most editions, stations in the immediate coverage area were shown with a white numeral inside a black TV-shaped bullet; stations from neighboring markets that could also be received locally were shown with a black numeral inside a white bullet outlined in black. For example, in the San Francisco edition, San Francisco and Oakland stations appeared in white-on-black bullets, while stations from Sacramento or Salinas/Monterey were listed in black-on-white bullets. A single listing could begin with three or more bullets if multiple local and nearby stations aired the same program (often different affiliates of the same network). See “Listings section” in the “Editions” section below for more detail.

Daily listings extended past midnight until the last station signed off for the night, sometimes as late as 4:00 a.m. local time. Each day’s program listings, meanwhile, started with the earliest sign-on, as early as 5:00 a.m., which eventually became the hard delineation point for each daily programming section as stations began signing on earlier or transitioned to 24-hour schedules. Initially, most programs in the log had brief synopses, except for local and national newscasts or certain shows. As more broadcast stations and cable channels were added, space limits required changes: detailed synopses were generally reserved for prime-time series and specials plus movies on broadcast television. Shorter synopses were used for out-of-market broadcasts and select cable channels, while most other programs were listed with only a title and basic details (such as genre or running time). Black-and-white ads for upcoming programs—first for broadcast stations and later for cable—were also included. These ads featured local airtimes and station information, with networks producing most national ads and local stations producing their own for newscasts or other shows, often using their distinctive logos (such as the ABC “Circle 7”). Ads for general products and services, like those in other magazines, also appeared.

A regular feature of the listings section was "Close-Up", usually a half-page segment, which provided expanded reviews of select programs airing each day (various editions of "Close-Up" were eventually used for different types of programs, from premieres of new series to shows airing on cable). Parades, classic movies, sports match-ups and political events could all merit Close-ups. Over time, other regular and recurring features (most of them television-related) were included alongside the listings including "Insider" (a television news and interview section in the lead pages of the color section); "Cheers and Jeers" (a critique page about various aspects of television programming); "Hits and Misses" (featuring brief reviews of select programs in the coming week, rated on a score from 0 to 10); "Guidelines" (a half-page daily section featuring highlights of five or six programs of interest); horoscopes; recaps of the previous week's storylines on network daytime soap operas; a page reviewing new home video (and later, DVD) releases; dedicated pages that respectively listed select sporting events, children's programs and "four-star" movies being broadcast during that week; and crossword puzzles. Although its issues usually focus on different television-related stories week to week, TV Guide also incorporates recurring issues that appear a few times each year, most notably the "Fall Preview" (an issue featured since the magazine's inaugural year in 1953, which features reviews of new series premiering during the fall television season), "Returning Favorites" (first published in 1996, featuring previews of series renewed from the previous television season returning for the upcoming fall schedule), "Winter Preview" (first published in 1994 and later known as the "(year) TV Preview" from 2006 to 2009, featuring previews of midseason series) and "The Best Children's Shows on TV" (first published in 1989 and later renamed the "Parents' Guide to Children's Television" in 1990, and finally as the "Parent's Guide to Kids' TV" in 1993, featuring stories and reviews on family-oriented programs).

Icons beyond channel bullets first appeared around 1956, with rectangular labels “SPECIAL” and “COLOR” being added to denote specials and color broadcasts. In May 1969, all icons were redesigned: the channel bullets changed from Futura to Helvetica, and TV-shaped bullets with a “C” identified color programs. As color became standard, beginning in August 1972 programs in black and white were instead marked “BW.” In September 1981, listings began identifying shows with captions or on-screen sign language interpretation. Listings also noted deviations from routine, such as “[Gunsmoke is pre-empted],” “(last episode of the series),” “Debut:” or “Special.” Until the 1970s, double or triple feature movie blocks were listed under the start time of the first film (“MOVIE—Double Feature”) with numbered bullets for each title. After 1970, each film received its own time entry.

==== Addition of cable listings ====
The advent of cable television would become hard on TV Guide. Cable channels began to be listed in the magazine in 1980 or 1981, depending on the edition; the channels listed also differed with the corresponding edition. Regional and national superstations available on cable systems in the designated market of many editions were the only cable channels listed initially as well as, in certain markets, over-the-air subscription services transmitted over local independent stations (such as ONTV); local subscription television services were often listed as "STV Programming" or "Subscription Television" for the channel carrying the service, with the service listed separately or, in some editions, not at all. Cable-originated channels – such as HBO, CNN (both of which the magazine originally promoted mainly in full-page advertisements), the CBN Cable Network (now Freeform), the Alpha Repertory Television Service (ARTS, later succeeded by A&E through its 1984 merger with The Entertainment Channel) and Nickelodeon – were added gradually between the winter of late 1981 and the first half of 1982, depending on the edition.

To save page space, TV Guide incorporated a grid (a rowed display of listings for programs scheduled to air during the evening hours each night, primarily organized by channel) into the listings in September 1981, which was slotted at a random page within each day's afternoon listings. The grid originated as a single-page feature that provided a summary of programs airing during prime time (from 7:00 to 10:00 p.m. or 8:00 to 11:00 p.m. depending on the start of prime time within a given time zone) on the stations mentioned in the corresponding edition; by 1985, it was expanded to a two-page section – which began to take up roughly three-quarters of the two adjoining pages on which it was placed – that included programs airing during the early access and late fringe periods (from 5:00 to 11:00 p.m. or 6:00 p.m. to 12:00 a.m. local time), with the beginning and end of the magazine-defined prime time daypart (between 7:30 and 11:00 p.m. or between 6:30 and 10:00 p.m. local time on Monday through Saturdays, and between 7:00 and 11:00 p.m. or between 6:00 and 10:00 p.m. local time on Sundays) delineated by a thicker border. Channels listed in the grid were organized by broadcast stations, basic cable channels, and premium channels.

In August 1982, the magazine expanded its coverage of cable programming with the introduction of two feature sections. The first, the "CablePay Section", was a separate color insert that followed the Friday listings, which provided highlights of programs airing on the national basic and premium cable channels (this feature was discontinued in 1985, at which time, cable program highlights were folded into the "Guidelines" feature). The second feature, the "Cable and Pay-TV Movie Guide" (later renamed the "Pay-TV Movie Guide" in 1984 and "Premium Channels Movie Guide" in 1997), initially followed the "CablePay" insert before being moved to the pages immediately following the Friday listings in May 1985, resulting in the national section – which had been cordoned into two sections, both preceding and following the local section – being consolidated into the first half of the pages comprising each issue. The "Movie Guide", which encompassed the last pages of each edition, provided summaries of films scheduled to air over the next one to two weeks on the cable channels included in both the log and grid listings (excluding those featured exclusively in the grids) as well as a first-page summary of the films scheduled to premiere that week (arranged by channel and sub-categorized by title). As the years went on, more cable channels were added into the listings of each edition. To help offset this, the May 11–17, 1985, issue introduced a smaller Helvetica font for the log, along with some other cosmetic changes; in particular, a show's length began to be listed after the show's title instead of at the end of its synopsis. That issue also saw advertising for local stations featured in the corresponding edition be restricted to certain special events, with most program promotions being restricted to those for national broadcast and cable networks.

=== News Corporation and Gemstar eras ===
On August 7, 1988, Triangle Publications was sold to the News America Corporation arm of News Corporation for $3 billion, one of the largest media acquisitions of the time and the most expensive publication transaction at the time. The November 3–9, 1990, issue saw the addition of VCR Plus+ codes in some of the magazine's regional editions, in order for users with devices incorporating the technology – which was developed by eventual TV Guide parent Gemstar International Group Ltd. – to input into their VCRs to automatically record television programs. (Two-digit PlusCodes corresponding to the channel airing the program that a user wished to record were listed after each channel in the channel directory page; one- to eight-digit codes for individual programs were listed in the log listings section following the title of each program.) The PlusCodes expanded to all local editions beginning with the September 14–20, 1991, issue. The September 12–18, 1992, issue saw the addition of bullet icons identifying colorized versions of older feature films.

On March 7, 1996, TV Guide launched the iGuide, originally developed by the News Corporation-MCI joint venture Delphi Internet Service Corp. as a web portal, which featured more comprehensive television listings data than those offered by the magazine (with information running two weeks in advance of the present date), as well as news content, TV Guide editorial content and a search feature called CineBooks, which allowed users to access detailed information on about 30,000 film titles. Later that year, content from the print publication was added to iGuide as well as content from News Corporation's other media properties. On January 13, 1997, shortly before MCI bowed out of the venture, iGuide was relaunched as the TV Guide Entertainment Network (TVGEN), which was renamed TV Guide Online in 2002. The refocused site covered television, music, movies and sports (with content concerning the latter sourced from Fox Sports), along with wire news and features from Reuters, Daily Variety and The New York Post, free e-mail updates for registered users, and a chat room that was developed to accommodate 5,000 users simultaneously.

Additional changes to the listings took place with the September 14–20, 1996 edition of the print publication. Starting with that issue, program titles switched from being displayed in all-uppercase to being shown in a mixed case, Franklin Gothic typeface, film titles – which had previously been displayed within the film description – began appearing before a film's synopsis in an italicized format (replacing the generic "MOVIE" header that had been used to identify films since the magazine's inception), and children's programs that were compliant with the Children's Television Act of 1990 began to be designated by a circular "E/I" icon. In addition, infomercials (which had been designated under the boilerplate title "COMMERCIAL PROGRAM[S]" until 1994, and "INFOMERCIAL[S]" thereafter) ceased being listed in the magazine during time periods in which stations aired them. (Time-brokered programs continued to be listed in the magazine, but were primarily restricted to religious programming.) Replacing the text identifiers that had been included within the film synopses, theatrically released films also began to be identified by a black-and-white boxed "M" symbol, accompanied depending on the film by its star rating (a formula, on a scale of one [for "poor"] to four [for "excellent"], based on a consensus of reviews from leading film critics, the quality of the film's cast and director, and the film's box office revenue and award wins). Movie icons also were appropriated to identify direct-to-video (marked as "M→V") or made-for-TV (marked as "M→T") releases, which were not assigned star ratings. Beginning with the January 25–31, 1997, issue, the log listings began incorporating content ratings for programs assigned through the newly implemented TV Parental Guidelines system (the system's content ratings were subsequently added upon their introduction in October 1998).

News Corporation sold TV Guide to the United Video Satellite Group, parent company of Prevue Networks, on June 11, 1998, for $800 million and 60 million shares of stock worth an additional $1.2 billion (this followed an earlier merger attempt between the two companies in 1996 that eventually fell apart). Following the sale, reports suggested that TV Guide would remove program listings from the magazine, shifting them entirely to its new sister cable network Prevue Channel, which would be rebranded as a result of United Video's purchase of TV Guide magazine; News Corporation executives later stated that listings information would remain part of the magazine. That year, United Video acquired TVSM Inc. (publishers of competing listings guides Total TV and The Cable Guide) in a $75 million all-cash acquisition; as a result, TV Guide merged with Total TV, and began printing a version of the magazine in the latter magazine's full-size format (while retaining the original digest size version) effective with the July 11, 1998, issue.

Because most cable systems published their own listing magazine reflecting their channel lineup, and now had a separate guide channel or an electronic program guide that can be activated by remote and provide the same information in a more detailed manner – with additional competition coming in the late 1990s from websites that also specialize in providing detailed television program information (such as TVGuide.com, then jointly operated with TV Guide Magazine, and Zap2It), a printed listing of programming in a separate magazine became less valuable. The sheer amount and diversity of cable television programming made it hard for TV Guide to provide listings of the extensive array of programming that came directly over the cable system. TV Guide also could not match the ability of the cable box to store personalized listings. Nevertheless, beginning with the September 12–18, 1998, issue, the magazine added several new channels to many of its editions, including those that had previously been mentioned only in a foreword on the channel lineup page as well as those that were available mainly on digital cable and satellite; although most of these newly added channels were placed within the prime time grids, only a few (such as the nature-oriented Animal Planet and MSNBC) were also incorporated into the log listings.

Features in the magazine were also revamped with the additions of "The Robins Report" (a review column by writer J. Max Robins), "Family Page" (featuring reviews of family-oriented programs) and picks of select classic films airing that week, as well as the removal of the "Guidelines" feature in the listings section in favor of the new highlight page "Don't Miss" (listing choice programs selected by the magazine's staff for the coming week) in the national color section. Listings for movies within the log also began identifying made-for-TV and direct-to-video films, as well as quality ratings on a scale of one to four stars (signifying movies that have received "poor" to "excellent" reviews).

In 1999, the magazine began hosting the TV Guide Awards, an awards show (which was telecast on Fox) honoring television programs and actors, with the winners being chosen by TV Guide subscribers through a nominee ballot inserted in the magazine; the telecast was discontinued after the 2001 event. The July 17–23, 1999, edition saw the evening grids be scaled down to the designated prime time hours, 8:00 to 11:00 p.m. (or 7:00 to 10:00 p.m.) Monday through Saturdays and 7:00 to 11:00 p.m. (or 6:00 to 10:00 p.m.) on Sundays, to complement the descriptive log listings for those time periods; this also allowed the grids to be contained to a single page in certain editions that provided listings for more than 20 cable channels.

On October 5, 1999, Gemstar International Group Ltd., the maker of the VCR Plus+ device and schedule system (whose channel and program codes for VCRs using the system for timed recordings were incorporated into the magazine's listings in 1988), and which incidentally was partially owned by News Corporation, purchased United Video Satellite Group; the two companies had previously been involved in a legal battle over the intellectual property rights for their respective interactive program guide systems, VCR Plus+ and TV Guide On Screen, that began in 1994. That month, TV Guide debuted a 16-page insert into editions in 22 markets with large Latino populations titled TV Guide en Español, which provided programming information from national Spanish language networks (such as Univision and Telemundo) as well as special sections with reviews of the week's notable programs. The magazine discontinued the insert in March 2000 due to difficulties resulting from confusion by advertisers over its marketing as "the first weekly Spanish-language magazine", despite its structure as an insert within the main TV Guide publication.

To commemorate the 50th anniversary of TV Guide as a national magazine, in 2002, the magazine published six special issues:

- "TV We'll Always Remember" (April 6–12): Our Favorite Stars Share Fifty Years of Memories, Moments and Magic"
- "50 Greatest Shows of All Time" (May 4–10): The Ultimate List of the 50 Best TV Series. (Just Try to Guess What's No. 1!)"
  - Note: This was the only one to be presented on television itself (in the form of a two-hour special) and referenced in the book TV Guide: Fifty Years of Television, considering the magazine's purpose to present weekly listings of regularly scheduled series.
- "Our 50 Greatest Covers of All Time (June 15–21): Fabulous Photos of Your Favorite Shows and Stars Plus: Amazing Behind-the-Scenes Stories"
- "50 Worst Shows of All Time (July 20–26): Not Just Bad! Really Awful – And We Love Them That Way!"
- "50 Greatest Cartoon Characters of All Time (August 3–9): Funny! Clever! Drawn to perfection! They're the tops in toons!"
- "50 Sexiest Stars of All Time (September 28–October 4): Charisma, Curves, Confidence, Charm! Could We Be Having Any More Fun?"

By 2003, the number of cable channels that were only listed in the grids expanded, with the addition of channels such as BBC America, Soapnet and the National Geographic Channel (some editions also featured a limited number of broadcast stations – either in-market, out-of-market or both – exclusively in the grids); conversely, sister cable network TV Guide Channel (whose listings were added to the magazine after the Gemstar purchase) was relegated from the log listings to the grids in most editions. From its inception until 2003, TV Guide had offered listings for the entire week, 24 hours a day. Numerous changes to the local listings took place beginning with the June 21, 2003, issue – in just a few select markets, when the 5:00 a.m. to 5:00 p.m. Monday through Friday listings were condensed down to four grids: these ran from 5:00 to 8:00 a.m., 8:00 to 11:00 a.m., 11:00 a.m. to 2:00 p.m., and 2:00 to 5:00 p.m. If programming differed from one weekday to the next, the generic descriptor "Various Programs" was listed. The weekday grid maintained day-to-day listings for certain cable channels (primarily movie channels as well as a limited number of basic cable channels such as Lifetime, The History Channel and NBC-owned USA Network), which were organized separately from the other channels. These changes became permanent in all TV Guide editions beginning with the September 13, 2003, "Fall Preview" issue.

Other changes were made to the magazine beginning with the June 21 issue in select markets and the 2003 "Fall Preview" issue elsewhere. A half-page daily prime time highlights section featuring the evening's notable shows, movies and sports events – similar to the former "Guidelines" feature – was re-added to the listings section; a full-page "Weekday Highlights" page was also added featuring guest and topical information for the week's daytime talk and morning shows as well as picks for movies airing during the day on broadcast and cable channels. In addition, while log listings continued in use for prime time listings, program synopses were added to the grids and log, as well as a "NEW" indicator for first-run episodes, replacing the "(Repeat)" indicator in the log's synopses. The "Premium Channels Movie Guide" was also restructured as "The Big Movie Guide", with film listings being expanded to include those airing on all broadcast networks and cable channels featured in each edition (as well as some that were not listed in a particular local edition), as well as movies that were available on pay-per-view (page references to the films included in this section were also incorporated into the prime time grids and log listings). Beginning in January 2004, the midnight to 5:00 a.m. listings (as well as the Saturday and Sunday 5:00 to 8:00 a.m. listings) ceased to include any broadcast stations outside of the edition's home market, leaving only program information for stations within the home market and for cable channels.

The magazine's format was changed beginning with the April 11, 2004, issue to start the week's listings in each issue on Sunday (the day in which television listings magazines supplemented in newspapers traditionally began each week's listings information), rather than Saturday. In July 2004, the overnight listings were removed entirely, replaced by a grid that ran from 11:00 p.m. to 2:00 a.m. that included only the broadcast stations in each edition's home market and a handful of cable channels. It also listed a small selection of late-night movies airing on certain channels. The time period of the listings in the daytime grids also shifted from starting at 5:00 a.m. and ending at 5:00 p.m. to running from 7:00 a.m. to 7:00 p.m. By this point, the log listings were restricted to programs airing from 7:00 to 11:00 p.m. In early 2005, more channels were added to the prime time and late-night grids.

==== Format overhaul and conversion to national listings ====
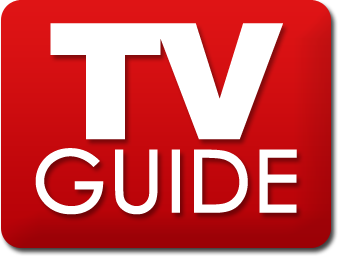
Former print logo used from 2002 to 2015; the current logo is based on this design.

On July 26, 2005, Gemstar-TV Guide announced that TV Guide would abandon its longtime digest size format and begin printing as a larger full-size national magazine that would offer more stories and fewer program listings. All 140 local editions were eliminated, being replaced by two editions covering the time zones within the contiguous United States: one for the Eastern and Central time zones, and one for the Pacific and Mountain time zones (which had existed separately from the local editions prior to the change, although their distribution was primarily limited to hotels). The change in format was attributed to the increase in the internet, cable television channels (like TV Guide Network), electronic program guides and digital video recorders as the sources of choice for viewers' program listings. The new version of TV Guide went on sale on October 17, 2005, and featured Extreme Makeover: Home Edition host Ty Pennington on the cover. The listings format, now consisting entirely of grids, also changed to start the listings in each week's issue on Monday rather than Sunday. As a result of the elimination of the local editions, broadcast stations were replaced by broadcast network schedules with the description "Local Programming" being used to denote time periods in which syndicated, locally produced or paid programs would air instead of network shows.

In September 2006, TV Guide launched a redesigned website, with expanded original editorial and user-generated content not included in the print magazine. On December 22, 2006, TV Guide introduced the magazine's first ever two-week edition. The edition, which featured star chef Rachael Ray on the cover, was issued for the period from December 25, 2006 to January 7, 2007. In early 2008, the Monday through Friday daytime and daily late night grids were eliminated from the listings section, and the television highlights section was compressed into a six-page review of the week, rather than the previous two pages for each night. By 2007, TV Guide's circulation had decreased to less than three million copies from a peak of almost 20 million in 1970.

With the $2.8 billion acquisition of Gemstar-TV Guide by Macrovision on May 2, 2008, that company, which purchased the former mostly to take advantage of their lucrative and profitable VCR Plus and electronic program guide patents, stated it wanted to sell both the magazine and TV Guide Network, along with the company's horse racing channel TVG Network to other parties.

==== TV Guide Talk ====
On May 18, 2005, TV Guide Talk, a weekly podcast that was available to download for free, was launched. The podcast was headlined by TV Guide reporter/personality Michael Ausiello, and was co-hosted by his colleagues at the magazine, Matt Webb Mitovich, Angel Cohn, Daniel Manu and Maitland McDonagh. Each episode featured commentary from TV Guide staff on the week's entertainment news stories, television programs, and film releases, as well as occasional interviews with actors, producers, and executives. On April 4, 2008 (following Ausiello's move to Entertainment Weekly), it was announced that the podcast would be ending, and the final episode (Episode No. 139) was released on April 10, 2008.

TV Guide Talk podcasts were released every Friday afternoon and averaged an hour in length. They featured the participants discussing and commenting on the past week in television and the entertainment industry in general. The beginning of each podcast was devoted to in-depth discussion on the week's biggest new story in the entertainment industry, whether it be a television program or something outside the scope of television show or movie (such as the Academy Awards or the Emmys). The middle part was devoted to discussion and commentary on individual shows. The podcast emphasized programs that tend to have a large online following even if that following is unnecessarily reflected in the programs' Nielsen rating. Examples include American Idol, Heroes, Lost, Survivor, Gilmore Girls, Veronica Mars and Project Runway (the latter three being examples a low-rated shows which nevertheless have sizable online followings). Each podcast also ended with a weekly review of that weekend's new theatrical releases.

=== OpenGate Capital era ===
On October 13, 2008, Macrovision sold the money-losing magazine (which was reportedly posting revenue losses of $20 million per year by that point) to Beverly Hills-based equity fund OpenGate Capital for $1, and a $9.5 million loan at 3% interest. As part of the sale, however, Macrovision retained ownership of the companion website – which was then sold to equity firm One Equity Partners for $300 million – which severed all editorial connections between the magazine and website, including the end of critic Matt Roush's presence on TVGuide.com. The editorial content of the magazine was launched on a new site, TVGuideMagazine.com, which did not feature TV Guide's listings in any form. TVGuideMagazine.com was later shut down on June 1, 2010; TV Guide magazine and TVGuide.com then entered into a deal to restore content from the magazine to the latter website, which Lionsgate Entertainment had bought along with the TV Guide Network in January 2009.

In January 2009, the magazine cut several networks from its grid listings – including music-oriented MTV and DIY Network – citing "space concerns"; however, two cuts, those of The CW and TV Guide Network, were seen as suspicious and arbitrary, as the magazine carries several channels which have the same schedule night after night or have low viewership and could have easily been cut, while several Fox-owned networks continued to be listed due to agreements with the former News Corporation ownership. It is likely that TV Guide Network's removal from TV Guide's listings was related to the "divorce" of the website and network from the magazine. In early February 2009, The CW and MTV were brought back to the listings after the magazine received numerous emails protesting the move; as a consequence, listings for several low-rated networks were removed. The other channels previously incorporated into the listings before their removal were slowly re-added, until TV Guide Network's schedule returned to the listings pages in June 2010 with its logo prominent within the grids as part of the deal with Lionsgate's TV Guide division. Under OpenGate ownership, TV Guide slowly returned to profitability mainly through cost reductions instituted by its venture capital parent, making significant staffing reductions and switching to biweekly editions full-time, reducing the number of issues it published to 29 per year.

==== Shift towards features ====
On June 26, 2014, OpenGate Capital announced that TV Guide would undergo a major redesign beginning with the August 11 issue; the magazine eliminated 14 pages of listings, with the listings pages that remained displaying programming information for only top-rated broadcast and cable networks. It also added "enhanced editorial features", including recommendation sections focusing on traditional television and online programming – such as additional content from senior critic Matt Roush (an expanded "Roush Review" column and an additional column featuring ten picks for each week's programs as selected by Roush) and several new sections ("Upfront", featuring trending television-related stories, infographics, question-and-answer columns and ratings charts; "The Guide", containing expanded highlights for each day's television programming, including sports, daytime programming and content available for streaming online; a monthly television-related technology column; "The TV Guide Interview", an occasional feature featuring celebrity interviews focusing on their career; and "On Demand", a review column of movies premiering through streaming and on-demand services). In addition, the magazine's size was reduced from 7 3/8 by 10 1/4 inches (190 mm × 260 mm) to 7 by 10 inches (180 mm × 250 mm) in a cost-saving measure; it also began to be distributed in airport newsstands.

=== Sale to NTVB Media ===
On October 8, 2015, OpenGate Capital sold the magazine and co-owned website TVInsider.com to Troy, Michigan-based publishing company NTVB Media for an undisclosed amount, marking TV Guide's third ownership transaction in eight years (OpenGate managing partner Andrew Nikou stated that the purchase price was for "more than $1 and less than $3 billion," while estimates from other industry sources stated that the magazine sold for a price within the range of $12 million). TVGM Holdings chief executive officer David J. Fishman and chief financial officer Joe Clemente, as well as the remainder of the magazine's 62-person staff, were to remain with the company; the magazine's corporate offices in New York City, Los Angeles and Newtown Square, Pennsylvania would also remain in operation – the former two of which also continue to base the magazine's editorial staff.

The acquisition made NTVB Media the largest owner of consumer television publications in the United States, with a combined reach of more than 20 million readers. NTVB already owned TV Weekly and Channel Guide, both of which provide national editorial content and – through syndication agreements with 160+ newspapers throughout the country, in which they are distributed as supplementary publications incorporated within each paper's Sunday editions – listings customized for individual regions (the company began distributing its listings magazines in this manner in 2008, as newspapers began to cease publication of their proprietary television listings magazines due to cost-cutting measures spurred by declining circulation and revenue); it also publishes listings publications for pay-TV providers such as Comcast, Time Warner Cable and Dish Network. As such, it is undetermined whether NTVB will reach deals to distribute TV Guide to newspapers on a separate basis or extend the name to its existing television publications. Staff with TV Guide and NTVB's other titles will collaborate on feature content included in the respective magazines, while the company will fold advertising sales for the magazine with its existing television magazine titles.

== Editions ==
From the magazine's inception until the October 2005 conversion to national listings based on time zone, TV Guide maintained a local-national hybrid format with local editions tailored to a specific region or individual market. Each regional edition generally served either a single city or a designated region (comprising the largest market[s] served by the edition and one or more smaller, adjacent markets, or a single or multiple neighboring states or provinces). South Dakota, Delaware and the U.S. territories did not have their own editions during the local listings era. In the case of the two U.S. states, Rapid City and Sioux Falls, South Dakota (which had their corresponding television stations listed in the Northern Colorado and Nebraska statewide editions, respectively), were presumably both considered too small to have their own editions and were located too far away from one another to be included in one edition; Delaware is split between two markets – New Castle and Kent counties are part of the Philadelphia market (which comprised two editions, the regional Southeast Pennsylvania edition and a market-specific edition for the Philadelphia area), while Sussex County is part of the Salisbury, Maryland, market (which had its stations listed in the Washington-Baltimore edition until 1994, and the Baltimore edition thereafter). Some editions that once provided statewide listings were eventually split off into separate editions that only provided listings for a specific region; in addition, certain markets have been added or dropped from some editions.

By the mid-1990s, nearly 150 editions of the magazine were published; during that decade, TV Guide began to diversify its editions from those for individual cities and multiple media markets within a given state or multi-state region to include editions for certain cable providers in larger television markets – which were later branded as "Ultimate Cable" editions – as well as editions for satellite providers such as DirecTV and Dish Network (which were published in addition to the listings magazines that both providers produced themselves).

=== Listings section ===
At left: A channel directory from the North Texas edition (from the October 11–17, 1997, issue); At right: A listings log from the Toledo–Lima edition for the morning of January 26, 1997, along with a "Cable Close-Up" feature for an Andy Griffith Show marathon on TBS (from the January 25–31, 1997 issue).

As noted above, each channel in the listings section was designated by a bullet, which, like the magazine's logo, appeared in the shape of a television screen (the earliest editions, until 1955, used a circle shape). Bullets used for broadcast stations contained a channel number, which had a different layout depending on the identified channel, and were often used in network promotional ads included to identify local affiliates carrying the advertised program. Filled black bullets with a white number overlaid on them indicated local broadcast stations located in one of the primary market areas served by a specific edition; white bullets with a black screen outline indicated stations in outlying secondary markets covered by the corresponding edition. Where more than one channel of the same number is listed in an edition, an alphanumeric identifier (with a letter next to the channel number) is used to disambiguate between these stations, generally in feature pages preceding the main listings. For example, in the Northern Wisconsin edition, "6M" was used to disambiguate WLUC-TV in Marquette, Michigan (which is identified with a white "6" bullet), while WITI in Milwaukee, identified in listings with a black "6" bullet, only used a "6" as its identifier in the feature pages.

There were some exceptions to this formatting. For example, the Hawaii edition had the primary Honolulu-based stations listed first, followed by their satellite sister stations, while the Pittsburgh, Pennsylvania, edition had that market's primary stations listed first, followed by the out-of-market outlets; the latter being unique with having the other stations listed below WPGH (channel 53) when it listed a show during non-network hours, and during a network-scheduled lineup – in this case, NBC – the primary station and channel being listed first – WPXI (11), followed by WJAC-TV/Johnstown (6), WTOV-TV/Steubenville (9), WBOY-TV/Clarksburg, West Virginia (12) and WFMJ-TV/Youngstown, Ohio (21) – instead of by order of over-the-air channel number for all stations. If a certain edition featured more than one station that transmitted on the same channel but served different markets, the primary station in the edition was designated by a black bullet with a white number, while the other was indicated by a white bullet with a black number; some editions have also used a split (half for stations broadcasting on frequencies from channel 10 and up; three split with the channel number in the middle) or vertical channel bullet if it covered a large area. At times, several editions with out-of-market channels would have the bullets changed, like the Memphis Edition, where stations outside the primary area (especially the original channels that served the Jackson, Tennessee, Jonesboro, Arkansas, and Tupelo, Mississippi markets, which became part of the lineup since that edition's 1960 inception) that was listed in black bullet/white numbers was reconfigured to white bullet/black numbers after more stations were added in 1980.

When the magazine first incorporated out-of-market superstations into the listings section in 1979–80, those channels were originally identified alphanumerically, indicated by a combination of their over-the-air channel number and a letter representing their originating market city (as examples, WKBD-TV in Detroit—which effectively served as the Fox affiliate for most of Michigan from October 1986 to December 1994 via cable—was listed as "50D", and KTVT in Dallas–Fort Worth—which operated as a regional superstation in areas of Texas outside of its home market, Oklahoma, Arkansas and Louisiana until the station's July 1995 conversion into a CBS affiliate—was listed as "11F", with the "F" referring to its city of license, Fort Worth). By 1984, the three major national superstations at the time, TBS, WGN and WOR (which were respectively identified as "17A", "9C" and "9N", the ending letters corresponding to their respective home markets of Atlanta, Chicago and New York City), were given conventional abbreviated letter designations used by other cable channels. Alphanumeric identifiers were also used in some regional editions to disambiguate broadcast stations with identical channel numbers—usually for an out-of-market station, with the numeric identifier used for either a local or out-of-market station—in genre-based listings pages (such as the sports guide), cross-references in the pages preceding the local listings and within the listings section for stations serving as default network affiliates (via cable) in markets without a local major network outlets. (One notable exception was the New Mexico edition, which from 1984 to 2005, included listings for Los Angeles stations KTLA, KHJ/KCAL, KTTV and KCOP-TV, which were available via cable in some parts of the state at certain points during that period, under the codes "TLA", "KHJ", "TTV" and "COP" instead of "5L," "9L" "11L" and "13L".)

The outlined bullets that were originally used only for out-of-market television stations were also assigned to cable-originated channels when those began to be incorporated into the listings section in 1981, indicating those services by a three-letter abbreviation in a condensed typeface: for example, "ESN" represented ESPN, "DSC" represented The Discovery Channel and "NIK" represented Nickelodeon/Nick at Nite. (E! and FX later became exceptions, as those channels were identified by two-letter abbreviations.) In certain cases, the abbreviation used (such as "AMC" for American Movie Classics, "TNT" for "Turner Network Television" and "MTV" for "Music Television") was that which the channel had already branded by (The Nashville Network [now Paramount Network] is a noted exception, as it was initially assigned the abbreviation "NSH," instead of its network-assigned initialism "TNN"). Following that group's launch in September 1998, in editions in which one or more smaller markets served by said edition had local affiliates of the primarily cable-only service, affiliates of The WB 100+ Station Group were also identified in the same manner as conventional cable channels (under the abbreviation "WB") for brevity. Some PBS state or regional member networks were listed similarly in certain editions (such as Mississippi ETV [now Mississippi Public Broadcasting], which was listed in the Memphis edition under the code "E"). Two pay cable networks, Cinemax and Showtime eventually rebranded in 1997 so that their respective TV Guide abbreviations—"MAX" and "SHO"—became the focal point of their logos. Some of the channels that were added to the prime time grids beginning with the September 12–18, 1998, issue were identified by four letter abbreviations (such as "BBCA" for BBC America and "HBOS" for HBO Signature). In cable-specific editions, a bullet indicating a broadcast or cable channel's local cable assignment (except where a broadcast station's cable channel assignment is the same as its over-the-air channel or where smaller cable systems are listed) appeared alongside the specific station or network indicator.

Some cable channels—mainly premium channels—had an asterisk displayed by them in that edition's channel directory, which meant that it was only listed in the evening grid (and later the "Pay-TV Movie Guide"). Cable channels like Cinemax and The Disney Channel initially had their programming listed exclusively within the prime time program grids in some editions of the magazine, but were later expanded to have their full daily schedules included in the log listings as well. In some larger markets where the local TV Guide edition maintained a regionalized format, pay-per-view services (such as Request TV and Viewer's Choice) were also included in the prime time grids. By the mid-1990s, most editions of TV Guide provided program listings for nearly all cable channels featured in each issue within both the grids and the log listings, although some editions continued to list at least one channel, such as The Movie Channel (the only premium service that was excluded from the log listings in many editions by that point—though its inclusion in the log, as with select other cable channels, varied by market—until the September 1998 additions of Starz, Encore, and the HBO multiplex channels HBO Plus (now HBO Hits) and HBO3 (now HBO Drama) to the listings), exclusively in the grids. (Starz and Encore were listed in select markets where either network was available prior to being expanded to all local and regional editions with the 1998 "Fall Preview" issue.)

If the same program or episode was scheduled to air in the same timeslot on more than one channel, two or more bullets identifying each channel would precede the program title listed in a particular time entry. The usage of multiple bullets to denote stations airing the same program was a more common occurrence in instances where multiple broadcast stations aired the same network program or their respective local news programs at the same time, although this also applied to broadcast and/or cable channels carrying the same episode of a syndicated program; separate time entries would only be used in this situation if the program had varying running times between channels (the grouping of bullets based on a station's affiliated network was later applied to the prime time grids beginning in September 2003). Another example would involve the synopsis or topic of the program listed; if the same description from the program aired on different channels later on in the day or during that week when it had aired first on another station listed in the edition, readers will notice "See ch.(xx) at (day/time) for details" below the program.

=== Channel directory ===
For much of the log listings era, the listings section was preceded by a channel directory, which listed the broadcast stations – and later, cable channels – whose program information was provided in each edition. The listed channels were organized numerically for broadcast stations and alphabetically (by abbreviation) for cable channels. Until cable-originated channels were added to the magazine, the directory exclusively listed broadcast television stations serving the individual markets serviced by the corresponding edition. Each station was listed in a separate entry corresponding to their city of license, and in some cases, one or more stations serving a particular media market were broken out from competing stations serving the same market based on their primary city of service (for example, in the Oklahoma City/Oklahoma State and North Texas editions, ABC affiliate KSWO-TV in Lawton, Oklahoma – which was designated under a black bullet until the Oklahoma City and Tulsa editions were consolidated into a singular Oklahoma State edition in November 2003, when it began being identified by the outlined bullets assigned to its same-market competitors – was listed as serving "Lawton/Wichita Falls", appearing in a separate entry from the three stations serving the primary city of that station's home market, Wichita Falls, Texas, NBC affiliate KFDX-TV, CBS affiliate KAUZ-TV and independent station-turned-Fox affiliate KJTL).

The directory originally appeared in the lower one-quarter of the listings section's first page; from the May 11–17, 1985, issue onward, it became a full-page insert that directly preceded the listings. Until the May 31–June 6, 1969, issue, the directory also included studio addresses for each of the listed stations. Beginning with the June 7–13, 1969, issue, a foreword was included in the directory to denote that all public television stations listed in the corresponding edition broadcast instructional programs for classroom use during the academic year; most editions did not provide listings for such programs, which were usually broadcast during the weekday morning and afternoon hours.

Additional forewording was added below the listed channels in the lineup page beginning with the September 10–16, 1983, "Fall Preview" issue (in select markets; expanded nationwide with the May 11–17, 1985, issue) that provided descriptions of channels that were not included in each issue; this foreword was removed beginning with the September 12, 1998, issue, as the magazine began adding many of the channels mentioned in that paragraph. If any broadcast television stations listed in a particular edition operated satellite stations to cover adjacent areas not adequately covered by the main signal, a notation listing each repeater – identified only by channel number – was included directing readers living in those areas to view programs on those station in correspondence to their originating station (for example, readers of the Northern Wisconsin edition would be guided to the following, "for programs on 3 Escanaba, Mich., see 5; on 28 Eau Claire, 31 La Crosse and 55 Ellison Bay, Wis., see 38; on 22 Sturgeon Bay, see 26.")

From the magazine's incorporation of cable-originated channels in its local editions in 1982 until 1984/85, nationally distributed basic cable channels (such as ESPN, Nickelodeon, Lifetime [and predecessors Daytime and Cable Health Network], and CNN) were typically separated from out-of-market stations distributed to area cable providers in the channel lineup page, under the heading "Satellite Program Services", while premium channels (such as Time Warner's HBO and Showtime) were categorized as "Pay-TV Services"; all cable channels listed in each edition were listed in alphabetical order thereafter, with premium services only being categorized separately from other cable channels in the prime time grids. Notations were also included in some editions, starting with the September 14–20, 1985 "Fall Preview" issue, to outline programming offered on certain local stations not listed in that edition. In some editions, particularly the "Ultimate Cable" and satellite editions, the channel lineup was diagrammed in the form of a conversion chart that listed each channel's assigned placement on cable and satellite providers as well as their VCR Plus+ code number; the lineup pages in some of the local editions switched to these charts beginning in 2003, listing channel slots for major cable providers within the local edition's home market (or in more regionalized editions, the largest markets served by that edition). The channel lineup page was dropped in June 2004 in most local editions.

== Related services ==
=== TV Insider ===
TV Insider is a website promoted internally as an online "guide to...TV" published by TV Guide's parent holding company TVGM Holdings, LLC, which launched in January 2015. The website features reviews and interviews from critics and columnists (such as Matt Roush) who write for the print magazine. TV Insider launched an identically titled print magazine dedicated to streaming services in February 2023, but the magazine ceased publication in April 2024, with some of the content incorporated into an expanded section of the regular TV Guide magazine.

=== TV Weekly ===
TV Weekly is a weekly magazine that offers television listings for viewers in the local markets, featuring the local channels and regional cable networks alongside the major network and cable outlets. The settings are similar to TV Guide's national listings.

=== ReMIND Magazine ===
ReMIND Magazine is a monthly publication dedicated to popular culture nostalgia, specifically in relation to the 1950s–1990s. ReMIND, like TV Guide Magazine, is published by NTVB Media, and its issues contain themed features, puzzles, and trivia quizzes.

=== Publications ===
==== TV Guide Crosswords ====
TV Guide Crosswords was a spin-off publication, first published in the late 1980s, based on the crossword puzzle feature in the penultimate page of each issue. The puzzles featured in TV Guide and the standalone magazine featured answers related to television programs, films, actors, entertainment history and other entertainment-related trivia. In addition to the regular magazine, TV Guide Crosswords also published special editions as well as books.

==== Parents' Guide to Children's Entertainment ====
TV Guide's Parents' Guide to Children's Entertainment was a quarterly spin-off publication, which was first released on newsstands on May 27, 1993. The magazine featured reviews on TV shows, home videos, music, books and toys marketed to children ages 2 to 12, as well as behind-the-scenes features centering on children's TV shows and movies. To limit confusion among readers, the Parents' Guide issues were printed as a standard-size magazine instead of the digest scale then applied by the parent TV Guide magazine. The magazine ceased publication following the Spring 1996 issue, with some content covered by the spin-off magazine ongoing to be featured in TV Guide's annual "Parents' Guide to Kids TV" issue, but discontinued in the early 2000s.

== Other TV Guide magazines ==
- A Canadian edition of TV Guide, which followed the same format as the American magazine but published editorial content directed from Canada, was launched in 1977 (prior to this, beginning in 1953, the American edition was published in Canada with appropriate localized television listings). It continued as a print publication until November 2006 (with only special editions being printed thereafter), after which it was replaced by the website under the URL of tvguide.ca, which operated until December 2012, at which point it was incorporated into the entertainment and lifestyle website The Loop by Sympatico. The Canadian publication's owner Transcontinental Media discontinued TV Guide's online editorial content on July 2, 2014, ceasing the Canadian edition's existence after 61 years; its listings department, which distributes programming schedules to newspapers and The Loop owner Bell Canada's pay television services (Bell Satellite TV, Bell Aliant TV and Bell Fibe TV) remains operational. In 2017, the American edition of TV Guide was distributed in Canada for a time.

National television listings magazines using the TV Guide name (verbatim or translated into the magazine's language of origin) are also published in other countries, but none of these are believed to be affiliated with the North American publication:

- In Australia, during the 1970s, a version of TV Guide was published under license by Southdown Press. In 1980, that version merged with competitor publication TV Week, which uses a very similar logo to that used by TV Guide.
- New Zealand has a digest-sized paper called TV Guide, which is not associated with the United States or Canadian publications. It has the largest circulation of any national magazine, and is published by Fairfax Media.
- In Mexico, a digest-sized publication called TV Guía is published by Editorial Televisa. It is unrelated to the American publication.
- In Italy, a digest-size Guida TV has been published since September 1976 by Mondadori.

== See also ==
- List of TV Guide covers
  - List of TV Guide covers (1950s)
  - List of TV Guide covers (1960s)
  - List of TV Guide covers (1970s)
  - List of TV Guide covers (1980s)
  - List of TV Guide covers (1990s)
  - List of TV Guide covers (2000s)
  - List of TV Guide covers (2010s)
  - List of TV Guide covers (2020s)
- TV Guide Canada
- TV Week
- TV Guide's 50 Greatest TV Shows of All Time
- TV Guide's 100 Greatest Episodes of All Time
