= List of TV Guide covers (1970s) =

This is a list of issue covers of TV Guide magazine from the decade of the 1970s, from January 1970 to December 1979. The entries on this table include each cover's subjects and their artists (photographer or illustrator). This list is for the regular weekly issues of TV Guide; any one-time-only special issues are not included.

== 1970 ==
Issue date	Cover subject	Type of cover	Artist
1970-01-03	"Here Come the 70s: How They Will Change the Way You Live"	Photograph	
1970-01-10	Fred MacMurray & Beverly Garland of My Three Sons	Photograph	
1970-01-17	The cast of Ironside	Photo montage	
1970-01-24	Tom Jones of This is Tom Jones	Photo montage	Roger Prigent
1970-01-31	Debbie Reynolds of The Debbie Reynolds Show	Photograph	
1970-02-07	Elizabeth Montgomery & Dick Sargent of Bewitched	Illustration	Bob Peak
1970-02-14	Karen Jensen, Laraine Stephens & Linda Harrison of Bracken's World	Photograph	
1970-02-21	James Daly & Chad Everett of Medical Center	Photograph	
1970-02-28	Clarence Williams III, Michael Cole & Peggy Lipton of The Mod Squad	Photograph	
1970-03-07	The Cast of Hee Haw	Photo montage	
1970-03-14	Diahann Carroll of Julia	Photograph	
1970-03-21	Jackie Gleason of The Jackie Gleason Show	Photograph	Philippe Halsman
1970-03-28	The cast of Laugh-In	Illustration	Jack Davis
1970-04-04	The cast of The Brady Bunch	Photograph	Gene Trindl
1970-04-11	Carol Burnett of The Carol Burnett Show	Illustration	Al Hirschfeld
1970-04-18	Burl Ives, James Farentino & Joseph Campanella of The Bold Ones	Photograph	
1970-04-25	Raquel Welch & John Wayne of Raquel!	Photograph	
1970-05-02	Glen Campbell of The Glen Campbell Goodtime Hour	Illustration	
1970-05-09	David Frost	Photograph	
1970-05-16	Vice President Spiro Agnew	Illustration	Norman Rockwell
1970-05-23	Mike Wallace, Tricia Nixon & Harry Reasoner	Photograph	
1970-05-30	Julie Sommars of The Governor and J.J.	Photograph	
1970-06-06	Robert Young of Marcus Welby, M.D.	Photograph	
1970-06-13	Johnny Cash of The Johnny Cash Show	Illustration	
1970-06-20	Susan Neher, Joyce Menges, John Forsythe & Melanie Fullerton of To Rome With Love	Photograph	
1970-06-27	Liza Minnelli	Photograph	
1970-07-04	Miyoshi Umeki, Brandon Cruz & Bill Bixby of The Courtship of Eddie's Father	Photograph	
1970-07-11	The cast of The Beverly Hillbillies	Illustration	Raymond Ameijide
1970-07-18	The Golddiggers	Photograph	
1970-07-25	The cast of Mayberry, R.F.D.	Photograph	
1970-08-01	Chet Huntley	Illustration	
1970-08-08	Ted Bessell & Marlo Thomas of That Girl	Photograph	
1970-08-15	Johnny Carson	Illustration	Norman Rockwell (1968 painting)
1970-08-22	Ken Curtis, Milburn Stone, James Arness & Amanda Blake of Gunsmoke	Illustration	Jack Davis
1970-08-29	Eddie Albert of Green Acres	Photograph	
1970-09-05	Richard Burton, Lucille Ball & Elizabeth Taylor on the set of Here's Lucy	Photograph	
1970-09-12	Fall Preview	Word art	
1970-09-19	Mary Tyler Moore of The Mary Tyler Moore Show	Photograph	
1970-09-26	The cast of Room 222	Photograph	Ivan Nagy / Camera 5
1970-10-03	Red Skelton of The Red Skelton Show	Illustration	
1970-10-10	Herschel Bernardi of Arnie	Photograph	
1970-10-17	The cast of The Partridge Family	Photograph	
1970-10-24	Don Knotts of The Don Knotts Show	Photograph	
1970-10-31	Mike Connors of Mannix	Photograph	Gene Trindl
1970-11-07	Renne Jarrett, John Fink & Celeste Holm of Nancy	Photograph	
1970-11-14	Christopher George of The Immortal	Photograph	
1970-11-21	Sally Marr, actress/model and subject of the report "What It Takes to Be a Starlet in the 70s"	Photograph	
1970-11-28	John Wayne and various guests of the special Sing Out, Sweet Land	Photo montage	
1970-12-05	Dick Cavett of The Dick Cavett Show	Illustration	
1970-12-12	Ed Sullivan & The Muppets	Photograph	
1970-12-19	Christmas	Photo montage	
1970-12-26	Diahann Carroll & Fred Williamson of Julia	Photograph	

== 1971 ==
Issue date	Cover subject	Type of cover	Artist
1971-01-02	"Remember 1970?"	Photo montage	
1971-01-09	Andy Griffith of The New Andy Griffith Show	Photograph	
1971-01-16	Johnny Cash & June Carter of The Johnny Cash Show	Photograph	
1971-01-23	Flip Wilson of The Flip Wilson Show	Illustration	
1971-01-30	James Arness of Gunsmoke	Photograph	
1971-02-06	Tony Randall & Jack Klugman of The Odd Couple	Photograph	
1971-02-13	Goldie Hawn of the special Pure Goldie	Photograph	
1971-02-20	Doris Day of The Doris Day Show	Photograph	
1971-02-27	Sharon Acker & Hal Holbrook of The Senator	Photograph	
1971-03-06	Broderick Crawford of The Interns	Illustration	
1971-03-13	Gene Barry & Robert Stack of The Name of the Game	Photograph	
1971-03-20	Harry Reasoner of ABC Evening News	Photograph	
1971-03-27	Michael Landon, Lorne Greene, Dan Blocker & Mitch Vogel of Bonanza	Photograph	
1971-04-03	"Cable TV: What's All The Talk About?"	Illustration	
1971-04-10	Academy Awards host Bob Hope	Illustration	Jack Davis
1971-04-17	Paul Newman	Photograph	
1971-04-24	Elena Verdugo & Robert Young of Marcus Welby, M.D.	Photograph	
1971-05-01	Lisa Gerritsen & Mary Tyler Moore of The Mary Tyler Moore Show	Photograph	
1971-05-08	Henry Fonda of The Smith Family	Illustration	
1971-05-15	"Television Journalism: An Inside Story"	Word art	
1971-05-22	David Cassidy of The Partridge Family	Photograph	
1971-05-29	The cast of All in the Family	Photograph	Gene Trindl
1971-06-05	Dan Rowan & Dick Martin of Laugh-in	Photograph	
1971-06-12	Lucille Ball of Here's Lucy	Illustration	
1971-06-19	Brandon Cruz & Bill Bixby of The Courtship of Eddie's Father	Photograph	
1971-06-26	Martin Milner & Kent McCord of Adam-12	Photograph	
1971-07-03	Michael Cole, Peggy Lipton & Clarence Williams III of The Mod Squad	Photograph	Raphael
1971-07-10	Cookie Monster of Sesame Street eating away at the TV Guide logo	Illustration	Jack Davis
1971-07-17	Chad Everett of Medical Center	Photograph	
1971-07-24	Lefty, titular star of The Wonderful World of Disney's Ding-a-Ling Lynx	Photograph	
1971-07-31	Henry VIII, the subject of The Six Wives of Henry VIII	Illustration	
1971-08-07	The cast of As the World Turns	Photograph	Sheldon Secunda
1971-08-14	Mitch Vogel, Lorne Greene, Dan Blocker & Michael Landon of Bonanza	Illustration	
1971-08-21	"Public Television: Is Anybody Watching?"	Word art	
1971-08-28	Howard Cosell, Don Meredith & Frank Gifford of Monday Night Football	Photograph	
1971-09-04	Jack Lord of Hawaii Five-O	Illustration	
1971-09-11	Fall Preview	Illustration	
1971-09-18	Sandy Duncan of Funny Face	Photograph	
1971-09-25	Shirley MacLaine of Shirley's World	Photograph	
1971-10-02	James Stewart of The Jimmy Stewart Show	Photograph	
1971-10-09	Hope Lange & Dick Van Dyke of The New Dick Van Dyke Show	Photograph	
1971-10-16	Mia Farrow	Photo montage	
1971-10-23	James Franciscus of Longstreet	Photograph	
1971-10-30	Larry Hagman & Donna Mills of The Good Life	Photograph	
1971-11-06	William Conrad of Cannon	Photograph	
1971-11-13	Rupert Crosse & Don Adams of The Partners	Photograph	
1971-11-20	Sally Struthers, Jean Stapleton, Carroll O'Connor & Rob Reiner	Illustration	Jack Davis
1971-11-27	Joanne Woodward of All The Way Home	Photograph	
1971-12-04	Julie Andrews & Carol Burnett of Julie & Carol at Lincoln Center	Photo montage	
1971-12-11	James Garner of Nichols	Photograph	
1971-12-18	The cast of The Partridge Family	Photograph	
1971-12-25	Christmas	Illustration	

== 1972 ==
Issue date	Cover subject	Type of cover	Artist
1972-01-01	"Remember 1971?"	Illustration	Bob Peak
1972-01-08	Flip Wilson of The Flip Wilson Show	Photograph	Gene Trindl
1972-01-15	"America Out of Focus: How - and Why - European Television Distorts Our Image"	Text graphic	Uncredited
1972-01-22	The cast of Mission: Impossible	Photograph	Don Ornitz
1972-01-29	David Janssen of O'Hara, U.S. Treasury	Illustration	Bernard Fuchs
1972-02-05	Raymond Burr & Elizabeth Baur of Ironside	Photograph	Gene Trindl
1972-02-12	Arthur Hill of Owen Marshall: Counselor at Law	Photograph	Gene Trindl
1972-02-19	A preview of U.S. President Richard Nixon's visit to China featuring Nixon shaking hands with Premier Chou En-lai	Illustration	John Huehnergarth
1972-02-26	Mary Tyler Moore	Photograph	Sherman Weisburd
1972-03-04	Johnny Carson	Photograph	
1972-03-11	Robert Young & James Brolin of Marcus Welby, M. D.	Illustration	Bob Peak
1972-03-18	Sonny Bono & Cher	Photograph	
1972-03-25	Peter Falk of Columbo	Illustration	
1972-04-01	Glenn Ford of Cade's County	Photograph	
1972-04-08	"TV Political Coverage: Fair or Biased?"	Illustration	John Huehnergarth
1972-04-15	Apollo 16 Astronauts	Photograph	Philippe Halsman
1972-04-22	Don Rickles	Photograph	Sherman Weisburd
1972-04-29	Susan Saint James & Rock Hudson of McMillan & Wife	Photograph	Don Ornitz
1972-05-06	Sandy Duncan	Photograph	Bob Willoughby
1972-05-13	Redd Foxx & Demond Wilson of Sanford and Son	Photograph	Gene Trindl
1972-05-20	Efrem Zimbalist, Jr. of The F.B.I. with real-life F.B.I. director J. Edgar Hoover	Illustration	Bernard Fuchs
1972-05-27	Carroll O'Connor & Jean Stapleton of All in the Family	Illustration	Ronald Searle
1972-06-03	Rod Serling of Night Gallery	Photograph	Gene Trindl
1972-06-10	Doris Day of The Doris Day Show	Photograph	Sherman Weisburd
1972-06-17	Julie London of Emergency!	Photograph	Martin Mills
1972-06-24	Mike Connors of Mannix	Illustration	Bob Peak
1972-07-01	Carol Burnett of The Carol Burnett Show	Photograph	
1972-07-08	Merv Griffin	Photograph	Gene Trindl
1972-07-15	David Cassidy of The Partridge Family	Photograph	Gene Trindl
1972-07-22	Martin Milner & Kent McCord of Adam-12 with series producer Jack Webb	Illustration	Mark English
1972-07-29	All About Love, American Style	Illustration	Rowland B. Wilson
1972-08-05	Countess Tolstoy Writes of Her Father As War and Peace Comes to Television	photo montage	ABC
1972-08-12	Leonardo da Vinci	Illustration	Leonardo da Vinci, Scala
1972-08-19	Chad Everett of Medical Center	Photograph	Ivan Nagy
1972-08-26	Olympics	Illustration	Bob Peak
1972-09-02	Jack Klugman & Tony Randall of The Odd Couple	Illustration	Jack Davis
1972-09-09	Fall Preview	text graphic	uncredited
1972-09-16	Yul Brynner & Samantha Eggar of Anna and the King	Photograph	John Bryson
1972-09-23	George Peppard of Banacek		
1972-09-30	Meredith Baxter & David Birney of Bridget Loves Bernie	Photograph	Philippe Halsman
1972-10-07	Bonanza	Illustration	
1972-10-14	Robert Conrad of Assignment Vienna		
1972-10-21	Carroll O'Connor & Cloris Leachman of Of Thee I Sing		
1972-10-28	Snoopy, Woodstock & Charlie Brown of the Peanuts special You're Not Elected, Charlie Brown	Illustration	Charles M. Schulz
1972-11-04	John Wayne	Photograph	David Sutton
1972-11-11	Alistair Cooke		
1972-11-18	Beatrice Arthur of Maude	Photograph	Martin Mills
1972-11-25	Search	Illustration	Bob Peak
1972-12-02	Mike Douglas	Photograph	Philippe Halsman
1972-12-09	Julie Andrews	Photograph	Mario Casilli
1972-12-16	Duke & Duchess of Windsor	Illustration	Richard Amsel
1972-12-23	Christmas		
1972-12-30	Barbara Walters	Photograph	Philippe Halsman

== 1973 ==
Issue date	Cover subject	Type of cover	Artist
1973-01-06	1972: The Year in Review	Illustration	Jim Sharpe
1973-01-13	China	photo montage	Audrey Topping/NBC
1973-01-20	Bob Newhart & Suzanne Pleshette	photograph	Sherman Weisburd
1973-01-27	The Rookies	photograph	Gene Trindl
1973-02-03	Bill Cosby	Illustration	Bernard Fuchs
1973-02-10	Paul Lynde et al.	photograph	Gene Trindl
1973-02-17	Rock Hudson & Susan Saint James	photograph	Albert MacKenzie Watson
1973-02-24	M*A*S*H	photograph	Sherman Weisburd
1973-03-03	William Conrad	Illustration	Charles Santore
1973-03-10	Marlo Thomas	photograph	Ken Regan/Camera 5
1973-03-17	Redd Foxx & Demond Wilson	photograph	Gene Trindl
1973-03-24	Ann-Margret	photograph	Harry Langdon
1973-03-31	Lucille Ball & Desi Arnaz, Jr.	photograph	Sherman Weisburd
1973-04-07	"When is Children's TV Going to Grow Up?"	Illustration	Isadore Seltzer
1973-04-14	Brian Keith & Shelley Fabares	photograph	Gene Trindl
1973-04-21	Raymond Burr	photograph	Gene Trindl
1973-04-28	The Waltons	Illustration	Paul Davis
1973-05-05	Peter Falk	photograph	Albert MacKenzie Watson
1973-05-12	Shirley Booth of A Touch of Grace	photograph	Ivan Nagy
1973-05-19	Mary Tyler Moore	Illustration	Richard Amsel
1973-05-26	Karl Malden & Michael Douglas of The Streets of San Francisco	Illustration	Charles Santore
1973-06-02	Carroll O'Connor & Michael Evans	photograph	Gene Trindl
1973-06-09	Richard Widmark of Madigan	Illustration	Bernard Fuchs
1973-06-16	Bea Arthur & Bill Macy	Illustration	Al Hirschfeld
1973-06-23	David Carradine of Kung Fu	photo montage	Gene Trindl
1973-06-30	Dennis Weaver of McCloud	photograph	Gene Trindl
1973-07-07	Dick Cavett	Illustration	Bob Peak
1973-07-14	Sonny & Cher	photograph	Prigent
1973-07-21	Robert Young & Chad Everett	photo montage	Mark English
1973-07-28	"The Lie That Wouldn't Die: TV's Great Sex Movie Scare"	text graphic	uncredited
1973-08-04	Kent McCord & Martin Milner of Adam-12	Illustration	Charles Santore
1973-08-11	Roy Clark	Illustration	Jack Davis
1973-08-18	Robert Fuller of Emergency!	photograph	Gene Trindl
1973-08-25	Buddy Ebsen of Barnaby Jones	Illustration	Bob Peak
1973-09-01	Miss America	Illustration	Barry Zaid
1973-09-08	Fall Preview	text graphic	uncredited
1973-09-15	"Pro Football '73: What's New? Who'll Win?"	Illustration	LeRoy Neiman
1973-09-22	Jack Lord & James McArthur of Hawaii Five-O	Illustration	Mark English
1973-09-29	"The War in Vietnam: What Happened vs. What We Saw"	Illustration	George Giusti
1973-10-06	Diana Rigg	photograph	Albert MacKenzie Watson
1973-10-13	"Does TV Go Too Far?"	text graphic	Herb Lubalin
1973-10-20	Telly Savalas of Kojak	photograph	Gene Trindl
1973-10-27	Ken Howard & Blythe Danner of Adam's Rib	photograph	Sherman Weisburd
1973-11-03	Deirdre Lenihan of Needles and Pins	photograph	Philippe Halsman
1973-11-10	A Very Special Week	Illustration	Charles Santore
1973-11-17	Frank Sinatra	Illustration	Bob Peak
1973-11-24	Jacques Cousteau	photograph	Cousteau Group
1973-12-01	Bill Bixby of The Magician	photo Illustration	Gene Trindl
1973-12-08	Mary Tyler Moore, Georgia Engel & Valerie Harper	photograph	Albert Watson
1973-12-15	Katharine Hepburn	Illustration	Bernard Fuchs
1973-12-22	Christmas	photograph	Bill Holland
1973-12-29	"Mason Reese: 7 Year Old Huckster"	photograph	Roger Prigent

== 1974 ==
Issue date	Cover subject	Type of cover	Artist
1974-01-05	"How You Saw the World on Television in 1973"	Illustration	
1974-01-12	Beatrice Arthur, Bill Macy & Conrad Bain of Maude	Photograph	Denis Plehn
1974-01-19	Bob Hope	Photograph	Sheldon Secunda
1974-01-26	David Carradine of Kung Fu	Illustration	Paul Davis
1974-02-02	Dom DeLuise of Lotsa Luck	Photograph	Gene Trindl
1974-02-09	Cast of M*A*S*H	Illustration	Jack Davis
1974-02-16	Michael Douglas & Karl Malden of The Streets of San Francisco	Photograph	Curt Gunther
1974-02-23	Richard Boone of Hec Ramsey	Photograph	Gene Trindl
1974-03-02	Jimmy Stewart of Hawkins	Illustration	Bernard Fuchs
1974-03-09	"How Show Biz Takes Over Our Local News"	text graphic	
1974-03-16	Carol Burnett & Vicki Lawrence	Illustration	Richard Amsel
1974-03-23	James Franciscus of Doc Elliot	Photograph	Ivan Nagy
1974-03-30	Susan Strasberg & Tony Musante of Toma	Photograph	Gene Trindl
1974-04-06	Carroll O'Connor of All in the Family, Bill Macy of Maude, Redd Foxx of Sanford and Son & their series' producer, Norman Lear	Illustration	Jack Davis
1974-04-13	Richard Thomas, Michael Learned & Ralph Waite of The Waltons	Photograph	Albert Watson
1974-04-20	Peter Falk of Columbo	Photograph	Ivan Nagy
1974-04-27	Bruce Bould, Dan O'Herlihy, Anthony Quayle, Ben Gazzara & Lee Remick of QB VII	Photograph	Mike Sheil / ABC
1974-05-04	Sam Melville, Georg Stanford Brown & Michael Ontkean of The Rookies	Illustration	Charles Santore
1974-05-11	Bob Newhart & Peter Bonerz of The Bob Newhart Show	Photograph	Albert Watson
1974-05-18	Lee Majors of The Six Million Dollar Man	Illustration	Bob Peak
1974-05-25	J.D. Cannon & Dennis Weaver of McCloud	Photograph	Carl Furuta
1974-06-01	Sonny & Cher	Illustration	Al Hirschfeld
1974-06-08	KQED-TV reporter Marilyn Baker who covered the SLA's kidnapping of Patricia Hearst	Photograph	Curt Gunther
1974-06-15	Kathy O'Dare & Ron Howard of Happy Days	Photograph	Albert Watson
1974-06-22	John Chancellor	Illustration	Mark English
1974-06-29	Esther Rolle & John Amos of Good Times	Photograph	Gene Trindl
1974-07-06	Lucille Ball	Illustration	Richard Amsel
1974-07-13	Johnny Carson	Illustration	Bernard Fuchs
1974-07-20	"The Boom in Made-for-TV Films"	Illustration	Robert Weber
1974-07-27	Lee McCain & Ronny Cox of Apple's Way	Photograph	Ivan Nagy
1974-08-03	Kevin Tighe & Randolph Mantooth of Emergency!	Illustration	Bob Peake
1974-08-10	"Games Viewers Play"	Illustration	Talone & La Brasca
1974-08-17	Police Story	Illustration	Mark English
1974-08-24	Susan Blakely	montage	uncredited
1974-08-31	Telly Savalas of Kojak	Illustration	Charles Santore
1974-09-07	Fall Preview	Illustration	George Giusti
1974-09-14	"They're Off and Running!" (The cover uses the mock-up of then-sister publication The Daily Racing Form with the shows listed in place of the horses)	Illustration	Logotype, format and type adapted from Daily, Racing Form®, which is a registered trademark of Triangle Publications, Inc.
1974-09-21	Football Preview	Illustration	Bob Peak
1974-09-28	Paul Sand of "Friends and Lovers"	Photograph	Ivan Nagy
1974-10-05	Sanford and Son	Illustration	Bruce Stark
1974-10-12	Valerie Harper of Rhoda	Photograph	Carl Furuta
1974-10-19	Freddie Prinze & Jack Albertson of Chico and the Man	Photograph	Phillipe Halsman
1974-10-26	Ralph Waite, Will Geer & Richard Thomas of The Waltons	Illustration	David Plourde
1974-11-02	M*A*S*H	Illustration	Rick Meyerowitz
1974-11-09	Sophia Loren: An Appreciation	Photograph	Norman Parkinson
1974-11-16	Robert Duvall, Al Pacino, Marlon Brando & James Caan of the film The Godfather	Illustration	Jack Davis
1974-11-23	"What a Week!"	Illustration	Playbill style poster of the week's highlights
1974-11-30	Teresa Graves of Get Christie Love	Photograph	Phillipe Halsman
1974-12-07	Michael Landon of Little House on the Prairie (Image is reversed for unstated reason)	Photograph	
1974-12-14	Esther Rolle, Jimmie Walker, Ralph Carter, BernNadette Stanis & John Amos of Good Times	Photograph	
1974-12-21	Christmas	Illustration	Raymond Ameijide
1974-12-28	"Wonderful Bowl Games, Wacky Parades"	Illustration	Ronald Searle

== 1975 ==
Issue date	Cover subject	Type of cover	Artist
1975-01-04	Angie Dickinson of Police Woman	Photograph	Mario Casilli
1975-01-11	David Janssen of Harry O	Photograph	Gene Trindl
1975-01-18	Theresa Merritt & Clifton Davis of That's My Mama	Photograph	Reed Fenton
1975-01-25	Gene Shalit, Jim Hartz & Barbara Walters of Today	Illustration	Bruce Stark
1975-02-01	James Garner of The Rockford Files	Photograph	Steven Schapiro
1975-02-08	"Greasing the Wheels of the MTM Comedy Machine," featuring Valerie Harper, Bob Newhart & Mary Tyler Moore	Illustration	Bob Peak
1975-02-15	Georg Stanford Brown, Bruce Fairbairn, Sam Melville & Gerald S. O'Loughlin of The Rookies	Illustration	Bernard Fuchs
1975-02-22	Telly Savalas of Kojak	Photograph	Pete Turner
1975-03-01	Jack Albertson & Freddie Prinze of Chico and the Man	Illustration	Al Hirschfeld
1975-03-08	Chad Everett of Medical Center	Illustration	Charles Santore
1975-03-15	Karen Valentine of Karen	Photograph	Tim Thimmes
1975-03-22	Karl Malden & Michael Douglas of The Streets of San Francisco	Illustration	Mark English
1975-03-29	Beatrice Arthur & Hermione Baddeley of Maude	Illustration	Ronald Searle
1975-04-05	Baseball Preview	Illustration	Ralph Fasanella
1975-04-12	Cher	Photograph	Pete Turner
1975-04-19	Frank Converse & Claude Akins of Movin' On	Photograph	Ivan Nagy
1975-04-26	Dennis Weaver, J. D. Cannon & Terry Carter of McCloud	Illustration	Jack Davis
1975-05-03	Valerie Harper & David Groh of Rhoda	Illustration	Al Hirschfeld
1975-05-10	Muhammad Ali	Illustration	Bernard Fuchs
1975-05-17	Barry Newman of Petrocelli	Photograph	Gene Trindl
1975-05-24	Jason Robards & Colleen Dewhurst of A Moon for the Misbegotten	Photograph	Bruce McBroom, ABC
1975-05-31	The cast of The Bob Newhart Show	Illustration	Bruce Stark
1975-06-07	The cast of Little House on the Prairie	Illustration	Jacob Knight
1975-06-14	"Violence on TV: Does It Affect Our Society"	Word art	unknown
1975-06-21	Sherman Hemsley, Isabel Sanford & Mike Evans of The Jeffersons	Photograph	Mario Casilli
1975-06-28	A special preview of the United States Bicentennial	Illustration	George Giusti
1975-07-05	Tony Orlando & Dawn	Photograph	Albert Watson
1975-07-12	"The Apollo-Soyuz Mission on Television"	Illustration	John C. Berkey
1975-07-19	The cast of Barney Miller	Photograph	Mario Casilli
1975-07-26	Howard K. Smith & Harry Reasoner of ABC Evening News	Illustration	Bernard Fuchs
1975-08-02	Mike Douglas of The Mike Douglas Show	Illustration	Richard Amsel
1975-08-09	Buddy Ebsen	Photograph	John R. Hamilton - Globe
1975-08-16	Randolph Mantooth, Robert Fuller, Julie London, Bobby Troup & Kevin Tighe of Emergency!	Photograph	Mario Casilli
1975-08-23	Ralph Waite, Richard Thomas & Michael Learned of The Waltons	Illustration	Ray Ameijide
1975-08-30	Carroll O'Connor of All in the Family	Illustration	Charles Santore
1975-09-06	Fall Preview	Word art	unknown
1975-09-13	"Experts Pick Hit Shows, NFL Winners"	Illustration	Jim Johnson
1975-09-20	Barbara Walters of Today	Photograph	Dominique Berretty/Black Star
1975-09-27	Howard Cosell of Saturday Night Live with Howard Cosell	Illustration	Al Hirschfeld
1975-10-04	Lee Remick of Jennie	Photograph	Photographers International Copyright
1975-10-11	The cast of The Family Holvak	Illustration	David Plourde
1975-10-18	"TV's Sex Crisis"	Word art	unknown
1975-10-25	Cloris Leachman of Phyllis	Photograph	Alfred Eisenstaedt
1975-11-01	Lloyd Bridges of Joe Forrester	Illustration	Bob Peake
1975-11-08	Julie Kavner & Valerie Harper of Rhoda	Illustration	Robert Heindel
1975-11-15	David Soul & Paul Michael Glaser of Starsky & Hutch	Photograph	Roger Prigent
1975-11-22	"A Banner Week!"	Word art	unknown
1975-11-29	Tony Curtis of McCoy	Illustration	Bernard Fuchs
1975-12-06	"Does America Want Family Viewing Time?"	Illustration	George Giusti
1975-12-13	Robert Wagner & Eddie Albert of Switch	Photograph	Albert MacKenzie Watson
1975-12-20	Christmas	Illustration	Andre Francois
1975-12-27	Robert Blake & Fred the cockatoo of Baretta	Photograph	Richard R. Hewett

== 1976 ==
Issue date	Cover subject	Type of cover	Artist
1976-01-03	Telly Savalas of Kojak	Illustration	Bernard Fuchs
1976-01-10	Ron Howard & Henry Winkler of Happy Days	Photograph	Mindas
1976-01-17	Angie Dickinson & Earl Holliman of Police Woman	Illustration	Richard Amsel
1976-01-24	Alan Alda, Mike Farrell & Harry Morgan of M*A*S*H	Photograph	Scott Enyart
1976-01-31	Steve Forrest of S.W.A.T.	Illustration	Bob Schulz
1976-02-07	Barney Miller	Illustration	Jack Davis
1976-02-14	Redd Foxx of Sanford and Son	Illustration	Charles Santore
1976-02-21	William Conrad of Cannon	Illustration	Jim Sharpe
1976-02-28	Bob Hope	Illustration	Bernard Fuchs
1976-03-06	Noah Beery, Jr. & James Garner of The Rockford Files	Photograph	Gene Trindl
1976-03-13	Jack Albertson, Freddie Prinze & Scatman Crothers of Chico and the Man	Photograph	Dorothy Tanous
1976-03-20	Danny Thomas	Illustration	Jim Sharpe
1976-03-27	Jack Palance of Bronk	Photograph	Roger Prigent
1976-04-03	Baseball Preview	Illustration	Bill Charmatz
1976-04-10	Police Story	Illustration	Jim Sharpe
1976-04-17	Gabriel Kaplan & Marcia Strassman of Welcome Back, Kotter	Photograph	Scott Enyart
1976-04-24	Beatrice Arthur of Maude	Illustration	Robert Heindel
1976-05-01	George Kennedy of The Blue Knight	Photograph	Gene Trindl
1976-05-08	Lindsay Wagner of The Bionic Woman	Photograph	Peter Kredenser
1976-05-15	Cast of On the Rocks	Illustration	Bill Charmatz
1976-05-22	Cindy Williams & Penny Marshall of Laverne & Shirley	Photograph	Dorothy Tanous
1976-05-29	Little House on the Prairie	Photograph	Scott Enyart
1976-06-05	Sonny Bono & Cher	Photograph	Roger Prigent
1976-06-12	David Janssen & Anthony Zerbe of Harry O	Photograph	Carl Furuta
1976-06-19	Louise Lasser of Mary Hartman, Mary Hartman	Illustration	Bill Nelson
1976-06-26	Mary Tyler Moore in Moscow	Photograph	Tony Esparza / CBS
1976-07-03	The United States Bicentennial	Illustration	Bob Peake
1976-07-10	Convention Previews	Illustration	Ronald Searle
1976-07-17	Olympic Preview	Illustration	Jim Sharpe
1976-07-24	Bonnie Franklin of One Day at a Time	Photograph	Peter Kredenser
1976-07-31	"Terrorism and Television: The Medium in the Middle"	Illustration	unknown
1976-08-07	Donny & Marie Osmond	Photograph	Peter Kredenser
1976-08-14	Peter Falk	Illustration	Al Hirschfeld
1976-08-21	Richard Thomas, Will Geer & Ellen Corby of The Waltons	Photograph	Dick Zimmerman
1976-08-28	Lee Majors of The Six Million Dollar Man	Illustration	Mark English
1976-09-04	Football Preview	Illustration	Bernard Fuchs
1976-09-11	Bob Dylan	Photograph	Richard Howard / Camera 5
1976-09-18	Fall Preview	Illustration	Bill Charmatz
1976-09-25	Jaclyn Smith, Kate Jackson & Farrah Fawcett of Charlie's Angels	Photograph	Peter Kredenser
1976-10-02	David Birney of Serpico (first issue to carry a UPC barcode)	Photograph	Roger Prigent
1976-10-09	Bernadette Peters & Richard Crenna of All's Fair	Photograph	Peter Kredenser
1976-10-16	World Series	Illustration	Roland Michaud
1976-10-23	Linda Lavin of Alice	Photograph	Peter Kredenser
1976-10-30	Election Preview	Illustration	Bernard Fuchs
1976-11-06	Clark Gable & Vivien Leigh	Illustration	Richard Amsel
1976-11-13	Dorothy Hamill	Photograph	John Stember
1976-11-20	NBC's 50th Anniversary	Illustration	Sam Maitin
1976-11-27	Paul Michael Glaser & David Soul of Starsky and Hutch	Illustration	Charles Santore
1976-12-04	Tony Randall	Illustration	Al Hirschfeld
1976-12-11	Valerie Harper	Illustration	Richard Amsel
1976-12-18	John Chancellor & David Brinkley	Illustration	Fred Otnes
1976-12-25	Christmas	Illustration	Ronald Searle

== 1977 ==
Issue date	Cover subject	Type of cover	Artist
1977-01-01	John Travolta of Welcome Back, Kotter	Photograph	Gene Trindl
1977-01-08	Super Bowl	Illustration	Roland Michaud
1977-01-15	Inaugural Guide	Illustration	Sam Maitin
1977-01-22	Roots	Illustration	Romare Bearden
1977-01-29	Lynda Carter of Wonder Woman	Illustration	William Goldberg
1977-02-05	Barbara Walters	Photograph	Henry Wolf
1977-02-12	Telly Savalas & George Savalas of Kojak	Illustration	Al Hirschfeld
1977-02-19	Nancy Walker	Photograph	Philippe Halsman
1977-02-26	Martha Raye & Rock Hudson	Illustration	Jim Sharpe
1977-03-05	Liv Ullmann	Photograph	Roger Prigent
1977-03-12	Lauren Hutton	Photograph	Dick Zimmerman
1977-03-19	"So Long, Mary": Mary Tyler Moore of The Mary Tyler Moore Show posing at the WJM-TV newsroom exit	Photograph	Peter Kredenser
1977-03-26	Jack Klugman of Quincy, M.E.	Illustration	Charles Santore
1977-04-02	Dinah Shore Colgate Winner's Circle	Photograph	John Zimmerman
1977-04-09	Baseball Preview	Illustration	Bob Peake
1977-04-16	Frank Sinatra	Illustration	Al Hirschfeld
1977-04-23	Mike Wallace, Morley Safer & Dan Rather of 60 Minutes	Illustration	Charles Santore
1977-04-30	David Frost & Richard Nixon	Photograph	John Bryson
1977-05-07	Valerie Bertinelli, Mackenzie Phillips & Bonnie Franklin of One Day at a Time	Photograph	Peter Kredenser
1977-05-14	Tom Brokaw of Today	Photograph	Daniel Kramer
1977-05-21	Farrah Fawcett of Charlie's Angels	Photograph	Douglas Kirkland
1977-05-28	Robert Blake of Baretta	Illustration	Bob Peak
1977-06-04	Alan Alda of M*A*S*H	Illustration	Bernard Fuchs
1977-06-11	Dan Haggerty & Bozo of The Life and Times of Grizzly Adams	Photograph	Richard Hewitt
1977-06-18	Cindy Williams & Penny Marshall of Laverne & Shirley	Illustration	Jack Davis
1977-06-25	The Waltons	Illustration	Jacob Knight
1977-07-02	Linda Lavin & Polly Holliday of Alice	Illustration	Bill Charmatz
1977-07-09	Peter Isacksen & Don Rickles of C.P.O. Sharkey	Photograph	Gene Trindl
1977-07-16	Barney Miller	Illustration	Ray Ameijide
1977-07-23	"Public TV in Turmoil"	Illustration	George Giusti
1977-07-30	Johnny Carson	Illustration	Al Hirschfeld
1977-08-06	Fozzie Bear & Kermit the Frog of The Muppet Show	Photograph	Ken Regan / Camera 5
1977-08-13	David Soul of Starsky and Hutch	Photograph	Peter Kredenser
1977-08-20	James Garner & Joe Santos of The Rockford Files	Illustration	Bob Peak
1977-08-27	"Sex and Violence: Hollywood Fights Back"	text art	Jerry Alten
1977-09-03	Jason Robards, Andy Griffith, Cliff Robertson & Robert Vaughn of Washington: Behind Closed Doors	Photograph	Gene Trindl / ABC
1977-09-10	Fall Preview	Illustration	Robert Cunningham
1977-09-17	Pro football preview	Illustration	Romare Bearden
1977-09-24	Betty White & John Hillerman of The Betty White Show	Photograph	Peter Kredenser
1977-10-01	Squire Fridell & Tony Roberts of Rosetti and Ryan	Photograph	Gene Trindl
1977-10-08	Donny & Marie Osmond	Illustration	Richard Amsel
1977-10-15	Ed Asner of Lou Grant	Illustration	Jim Sharpe
1977-10-22	Ron Palillo, Lawrence Hilton-Jacobs, Gabriel Kaplan, John Travolta & Robert Hegyes of Welcome Back, Kotter	Illustration	Jack Davis
1977-10-29	Beverly Archer of We've Got Each Other	Photograph	Douglas Strock
1977-11-05	Parker Stevenson & Shaun Cassidy of The Hardy Boys Mysteries	Photograph	Richard Hewitt
1977-11-12	The Godfather, Part II	Illustration	Charles Santore
1977-11-19	Frank Sinatra	Illustration	Richard Amsel
1977-11-26	Soap	Illustration	Jack Davis
1977-12-03	Patrick Duffy of The Man from Atlantis	Illustration	Bob Peak
1977-12-10	"What the Censors Cut...and Why"	Photograph	Seymour Mednick
1977-12-17	Bonnie Franklin, Mackenzie Phillips, Valerie Bertinelli & Pat Harrington, Jr. of One Day at a Time	Illustration	David Plourde
1977-12-24	Christmas	Illustration	Charles Saxon
1977-12-31	Kevin Dobson & Telly Savalas of Kojak	Illustration	Robert Giusti

== 1978 ==
Issue date	Cover subject	Type of cover	Artist
1978-01-07	Henry Winkler, Ron Howard, Donny Most & Anson Williams of Happy Days	Photograph	Carl Furuta
1978-01-14	The First Nighttime Super Bowl	Illustration	Charles Addams
1978-01-21	Family	Photograph	Peter Kredenser
1978-01-28	Dan Haggerty & Bozo of The Life and Times of Grizzly Adams	Illustration	Robert E. Schulz
1978-02-04	Lauren Tewes, Gavin MacLeod, Ted Lange, Bernie Kopell & Fred Grandy of The Love Boat	Illustration	Rowland B. Wilson
1978-02-11	Jack Klugman & Garry Walberg of Quincy, M.E.	Photograph	Gene Trindl
1978-02-18	Kate Jackson, Jaclyn Smith & Cheryl Ladd of Charlie's Angels	Photograph	Harry Langdon
1978-02-25	M*A*S*H	Illustration	Ray Ameijide
1978-03-04	Lynnie Greene & Bess Armstrong of On Our Own	Photograph	Roger Prigent
1978-03-11	Kene Holliday & Victor French of Carter Country	Illustration	Bob Peak
1978-03-18	Lindsay Wagner of The Bionic Woman	Photograph	Don Peterson
1978-03-25	Walter Cronkite & Mary Tyler Moore, hosts of CBS: On the Air	Photograph	Peter Kredenser
1978-04-01	Baseball Preview	Illustration	Bernard Fuchs
1978-04-08	Alice	Illustration	Richard Amsel
1978-04-15	Holocaust	Illustration	Lev Haas
1978-04-22	"Changing the Shape of Television"	Illustration	John Cayea
1978-04-29	Laverne & Shirley	Photograph	Douglas Kirkland
1978-05-06	Buddy Ebsen of Barnaby Jones	Illustration	Mark English
1978-05-13	Little House on the Prairie	Illustration	Stan Hunter
1978-05-20	Three's Company	Illustration	Richard Amsel
1978-05-27	Phil Donahue	Photograph	Arnold Zahn
1978-06-03	Paul Michael Glaser & David Soul of Starsky and Hutch	Illustration	Robert E. Schulz
1978-06-10	"UFOs on TV: Flying in the Face of Logic"	Illustration	John Berkey
1978-06-17	Valerie Harper of Rhoda	Photograph	Douglas Kirkland
1978-06-24	"Can You Believe the Ratings? A New Perspective"	Illustration	Jerry Alten
1978-07-01	Ricardo Montalbán & Herve Villechaize of Fantasy Island	Illustration	Bob Peak
1978-07-08	Cast members of The Young and the Restless	Photograph	Peter Kredenser
1978-07-15	Robert Conrad of The Black Sheep Squadron	Illustration	David Edward Byrd
1978-07-22	Gavin MacLeod of The Love Boat	Photograph	Gene Trindl
1978-07-29	Cast of Saturday Night Live	Illustration	Jack Davis
1978-08-05	Sherman Hemsley, Paul Benedict & Isabel Sanford of The Jeffersons	Illustration	Charles Santore
1978-08-12	David Hartman of Good Morning America	Photograph	Henry Grossman
1978-08-19	"America Speaks Out About Sports on TV"	Illustration	Don Weller
1978-08-26	Cheryl Ladd of Charlie's Angels	Photograph	Peter Kredenser
1978-09-02	Football Preview	Illustration	Robert Giusti
1978-09-09	Special Issue: Fall Preview	Illustration	George Giusti
1978-09-16	Battlestar Galactica	Illustration	David Byrd
1978-09-23	Mary Tyler Moore	Photograph	Douglas Kirkland
1978-09-30	Centennial	Illustration	Jim Thorpe
1978-10-07	World Series	Illustration	Wilson McLean
1978-10-14	Robert Urich of Vega$	Photograph	Douglas Kirkland
1978-10-21	WKRP in Cincinnati	Photograph	Robert Phillips
1978-10-28	Pam Dawber & Robin Williams of Mork & Mindy	Photograph	Peter Kredenser
1978-11-04	John Travolta of Welcome Back, Kotter	Illustration	Richard Amsel
1978-11-11	Ron Leibman of Kaz	Illustration	Charles Santore
1978-11-18	"Foreign Lobbyists: How They Try to Manipulate U.S. Television"	Illustration	George Giusti
1978-11-25	Suzanne Somers of Three's Company	Photograph	Robert Phillips
1978-12-02	"A Benji Special"	Photograph	Richard Hewett
1978-12-09	Linda Kelsey & Ed Asner of Lou Grant	Illustration	Bernard Fuchs
1978-12-16	Eight Is Enough cast	Photograph	Jim McHugh
1978-12-23	Christmas	Illustration	Ronald Searle
1978-12-30	Dick Clark	Illustration	Robert Giusti

== 1979 ==
Issue date	Cover subject	Type of cover	Artist
1979-01-06	Carroll O'Connor & Jean Stapleton of All in the Family	Illustration	Al Hirschfeld
1979-01-13	"Network News Chiefs on the Hottest TV News Controversies"	Photograph	Ken Regan / Camera 5
1979-01-20	Super Bowl XIII	Illustration	George Giusti
1979-01-27	Katharine Hepburn	Illustration	Richard Amsel
1979-02-03	Larry Wilcox & Erik Estrada of CHiPs	Illustration	Jim Sharpe
1979-02-10	The Shakespeare Plays	Illustration	Milton Glaser
1979-02-17	Roots: The Next Generations	Illustration	Ted Coconis
1979-02-24	James Arness of How the West Was Won	Illustration	Daniel Swartz
1979-03-03	Gary Coleman of Diff'rent Strokes	Photograph	Gene Trindl
1979-03-10	Harry Reasoner, Dan Rather, Morley Safer & Mike Wallace of 60 Minutes	Illustration	Robert Pryor
1979-03-17	Mike Farrell & Alan Alda of M*A*S*H	Photograph	Tony Korody / Sigma
1979-03-24	Ricardo Montalbán of Fantasy Island	Illustration	Bernard Fuchs
1979-03-31	Baseball Preview	Illustration	Ronald Searle
1979-04-07	Maren Jensen of Battlestar Galactica	Photograph	Peter Kredenser
1979-04-14	John S. Ragin & Jack Klugman of Quincy, M.E.	Illustration	Bob Peak
1979-04-21	Walter Cronkite	Photograph	Karsh
1979-04-28	Danny DeVito & Judd Hirsch of Taxi	Illustration	Charles Santore
1979-05-05	James Stephens & John Houseman of The Paper Chase	Illustration	Daniel Schwartz
1979-05-12	"What Viewers Love/Hate About Television"	Illustration	Al Francekevitch
1979-05-19	Cindy Williams & Penny Marshall of Laverne & Shirley	Illustration	Richard Amsel
1979-05-26	Ken Howard of The White Shadow	Photograph	Doug Dubler
1979-06-02	James Garner of The Rockford Files	Illustration	Bernard Fuchs
1979-06-09	Donna Pescow of Angie	Photograph	Robert Phillips
1979-06-16	Victoria Principal, Patrick Duffy & Jim Davis of Dallas at Enterprise Ranch	Photograph	Robert Phillips
1979-06-23	Johnny Carson	Illustration	Jim Sharpe
1979-06-30	John Schneider, Catherine Bach & Tom Wopat of The Dukes of Hazzard	Photograph	Robert Phillips
1979-07-07	Barney Miller	Photograph	Pete Turner
1979-07-14	Michael Landon, Melissa Sue Anderson & Linwood Boomer of Little House on the Prairie	Photograph	Gene Trindl
1979-07-21	Greg Evigan & Sam the chimp of B. J. and the Bear	Photograph	Pete Turner
1979-07-28	Lou Ferrigno & Bill Bixby of The Incredible Hulk	Photograph	Pete Turner
1979-08-04	Joyce DeWitt of Three's Company	Photograph	Martin Mills
1979-08-11	Rod Arrants of Search for Tomorrow	Photograph	Henry Grossman
1979-08-18	Ed Asner, Nancy Marchand & Mason Adams of Lou Grant	Photograph	Jim Britt
1979-08-25	Football Preview	Illustration	Milton Glaser
1979-09-01	Miss America	Illustration	Richard Amsel
1979-09-08	Fall Preview	Illustration	Michael Foreman
1979-09-15	Robert Guillaume of Benson	Photograph	Robert Phillips
1979-09-22	Carroll O'Connor	Photograph	Robert Phillips
1979-09-29	Pope John Paul II	Photograph	Sipa Press / Black Star
1979-10-06	World Series	Illustration	Robert Giusti
1979-10-13	Tom Snyder	Photograph	Henry Grossman
1979-10-20	Loni Anderson, Howard Hesseman & Gary Sandy of WKRP in Cincinnati	Photograph	Seymour Mednick
1979-10-27	Muhammad Ali	Photograph	Howard Bingham
1979-11-03	Stefanie Powers & Robert Wagner of Hart to Hart	Photograph	Robert Phillips
1979-11-10	The Bee Gees	Photograph	Robert Phillips
1979-11-17	Wilfrid Hyde-White & Shelley Smith of The Associates	Photograph	Peter Kredenser
1979-11-24	Pernell Roberts of Trapper John, M.D.	Photograph	Ken Whitmore
1979-12-01	Barbara Walters	Photograph	Robert Phillips
1979-12-08	"Talk Show Hosts: Who Are the Best--and Why?"	Illustration	Don Daily
1979-12-15	Henry Winkler of Happy Days	Photograph	Gene Trindl
1979-12-22	Christmas	Illustration	Michael Foreman
1979-12-29	Shelley Hack, Cheryl Ladd & Jaclyn Smith of Charlie's Angels	Photograph	ABC

== Sources ==
- Covers and table of contents page descriptions for the various issues.
  - TV Guide cover archive: 1970s (is without the descriptions it seems)
- TV Guide: Fifty Years of Television, New York, NY: Crown Publishers, 2002. ISBN 1-4000-4685-8
- Stephen Hofer, ed., TV Guide: The Official Collectors Guide, Braintree, Mass.: BangZoom Publishers, 2006. ISBN 0-9772927-1-1.
- "50 Greatest TV Guide Covers," article from the June 15, 2002 edition of TV Guide
- Information from ellwanger.tv's TV Guide collection section
