= Richard Amsel =

American illustrator and graphic designer

- Born: December 4, 1947; Philadelphia, Pennsylvania, U.S.
- Died: November 13, 1985 (aged 37); New York City, New York, U.S.
- Cause of death: Complications from AIDS
- Occupations: Illustrator and graphic designer
- Years active: 1969-1985

Richard Amsel (December 4, 1947 – November 13, 1985) was an American illustrator and graphic designer. His career was brief but prolific, including film posters, album covers, and magazine covers. His portrait of comedian Lily Tomlin for the cover of Time is now part of the permanent collection at the Smithsonian Institution. He was associated with TV Guide for thirteen years.

== Early life ==
The Sting, 1973

Richard Amsel was born in Philadelphia. Shortly after graduating from Philadelphia College of Art, his proposed poster art for the Barbra Streisand musical Hello, Dolly! was selected by 20th Century Fox for the film's campaign after a nationwide artists’ talent search; the artist was 22 at the time.

== Career ==
As Amsel came to the attention of New York's art enthusiasts, his illustrations caught the attention of Barry Manilow, "then a young singer/songwriter named who was working with Bette Midler, a newly emerging entertainer in cabaret clubs and piano bars. Manilow introduced the two, and it was quickly decided that Amsel should do the cover of her first Atlantic Records album. The cover, for The Divine Miss M proved to be one of the most ubiquitous of the year." More album covers and posters soon followed, as did a series of magazine ads for designer Oleg Cassini.

Amsel's film posters commissions included some of the most important and popular films of the 1970s, including The Champ, Chinatown, Julia, The Last Picture Show, The Last Tycoon, The Life and Times of Judge Roy Bean, McCabe & Mrs. Miller, The Muppet Movie, Murder on the Orient Express, Nashville, Papillon, The Shootist, The Sting, (The latter's poster design paid homage to the painting style of J. C. Leyendecker, evoking both his "Arrow Collar Man" and his covers for The Saturday Evening Post) and Woodstock.

Although Amsel's career was short-lived, his body of work was sizeable, outpacing much of what had been produced by others during his era. His portrait of comedian Lily Tomlin was featured on the cover of Time, and is now housed in the permanent collection at the Smithsonian Institution in Washington D.C. In keeping with the magazine's stringent deadlines, Amsel's illustration was created in only two or three days.

=== TV Guide ===
Commissioned by TV Guide in 1972 to design a cover featuring the Duke and Duchess of Windsor, in conjunction with a telefilm about their love affair, Amsel then went on to enjoy a 13-year association with the publication, during which time he produced more than 40 covers.

Amsel's magazine work included portraits of: Ingrid Bergman, Johnny Carson, Judy Garland, Katharine Hepburn, Mary Tyler Moore, Elvis Presley, Nancy Reagan, Tom Selleck, Frank Sinatra, John Travolta, and Princess Grace, as well as of Clark Gable and Vivien Leigh, portraits which were created for the television debut of Gone with the Wind. He also created illustrations for the wedding of Prince Charles and Diana, Princess of Wales, and of Richard Chamberlain for the miniseries Shogun.

Among the most famous of Amsel's illustrations was his portrait of Lucille Ball, which was created for the magazine's July 6, 1974, issue in recognition of Ball's retirement from series television. "I did not want the portrait to be of Lucy Ricardo," Amsel explained, "but I didn't want a modern-day Lucy Carter either. I wanted it to have the same timeless sense of glamour that Lucy herself has. She is, after all, a former Goldwyn Girl. I hoped to capture the essence of all this." Ball then featured Amsel's work in the opening credits of a two-hour television tribute, CBS Salutes Lucy: The First 25 Years.

=== Later career ===
As film studios changed their marketing style in the 1980s, employing photographs in favor of illustrations, Amsel and other artists were frequently limited to creating work for science fiction, fantasy, and adventure films. In response, Amsel created the posters for Flash Gordon, The Dark Crystal, and Raiders of the Lost Ark which ultimately became his most famous work. Amsel completed two posters, one for Raiders' 1981 release and another, a year later, for its re-release. It has been reported that George Lucas and Steven Spielberg own the originals.

Regarding commercial art, Amsel stated, "Commercial art can be and sometimes is art, but if someone hangs a poster, it is still a poster pretending to be something it's not. My work is basically for the printed page, and not for hanging in living rooms... If, however, I paint or draw something that takes people into the realm of fantasy, then I feel that I've accomplished something."

=== Recognition ===
During his career, Amsel received multiple awards, including the New York and Los Angeles Society of Illustrators award, a Golden Key Award from The Hollywood Reporter, and a Grammy Award, as well as citations from the Philadelphia Art Director's Club. Amsel's covers were also shown at the Museum of Television and Radio in Beverly Hills, commemorating TV Guide's fortieth anniversary.

Posthumously awarded the University of the Art's Silver Star award for Outstanding Alumni in 2009, Amsel's award was accepted on his behalf at the University of the Arts Commencement Ceremony by his brother, Michael Amsel.

In November 2021, Amsel was inducted into the Album Cover Hall of Fame, for his contributions to Bette Midler (Divine Miss M and Songs for the New Depression) and soundtracks to the films Hello Dolly and The Sting.

In July 2023, The Society of Illustrators in New York announced that Amsel would be inducted into their Hall of Fame, in a special ceremony to be held on Sept. 9, 2023.

A feature film documentary about Amsel's life, titled Amsel: Illustrator of the Lost Art, was announced in January 2016. Filmmaker Adam McDaniel traveled extensively throughout the United States, conducting interviews with over 50 of Amsel's friends, family members, colleagues, classmates, teachers, and art collectors, as well as new generations of artists whom Amsel inspired. The film is now in post production. The film's initial teaser trailer was released in October, 2022.

In tandem with the documentary, McDaniel is developing a retrospective art book, with both projects through an exclusive agreement with the Richard Amsel estate.

== Death ==
Amsel's last film poster was for Mad Max Beyond Thunderdome, the third of George Miller's apocalyptic action movies with Mel Gibson.

Amsel's final completed artwork was for an issue of TV Guide, featuring news anchors Tom Brokaw, Peter Jennings and Dan Rather. Amsel died less than three weeks later, succumbing to complications from AIDS on November 13, 1985.

== AIDS Memorial Quilt ==
Adam McDaniel created a panel in Amsel's memory for inclusion within the NAMES Project AIDS Memorial Quilt. It was unveiled for the first time on World AIDS Day, December 1, 2018, next to The Wall Las Memorias AIDS Monument within Los Angeles' Lincoln Park. Later that month, it was also displayed at an Amsel tribute art show McDaniel curated at Warner Bros. Studios, in Burbank, California. On December 2, 2019, McDaniel handed the panel over to the SUNY Downstate Medical Center in Brooklyn, NY. This coincided with World AIDS Day earlier on December 1, and what would have been Amsel's 72nd birthday on December 4.

== See also ==
- List of TV Guide covers

== Similar artists ==
- Saul Bass
- Jack Davis
- Frank Frazetta
- The Brothers Hildebrandt
- Tom Jung
- Steven Chorney
- Frank McCarthy
- Bob Peak
- Drew Struzan
- Howard Terpning
