= Joanne Rio =

American actress

- Rio in 1954
- Born: Joanne Gloria Rotunno; December 15, 1931; Chicago, Illinois, US
- Died: November 29, 1984 (aged 52); Los Angeles, California, US
- Occupation: Actress
- Spouse: David Barr

Joanne Gloria Rio (née Rotunno; December 15, 1931 – November 29, 1984) was an American actress.

== Early life ==
She was born Joanne Gloria Rotunno in Chicago on December 15, 1931. She was the daughter of Eddie Rio, who in 1954 was the West Coast head of the American Guild of Variety Artists.

== Career ==
Apart from acting in her own right, she also worked as a stand-in for Elizabeth Taylor.

== Personal life ==
In 1954, she was engaged to Liberace, but her father stopped her marrying as he was concerned about rumours of his sexuality. In November 1954, Rio appeared on the front cover of TV Guide, alongside Liberace.

== Selected filmography ==
- Riding with Buffalo Bill (1954) as María Pérez
- Seminole Uprising (1955)

== Selected television ==
- The Joey Bishop Show (1961)
