= Riding with Buffalo Bill =

- Original theater lobby card
- Directed by: Spencer Gordon Bennet (as Spencer G Bennet)
- Screenplay by: George H. Plympton
- Story by: George H. Plympton
- Produced by: Sam Katzman
- Starring: Marshall Reed
- Cinematography: Ira H. Morgan
- Edited by: Earl Turner
- Color process: Black and white
- Production company: Sam Katzman Productions
- Distributed by: Columbia Pictures
- Release date: November 11, 1954
- Running time: 280 minutes (15 episodes)
- Country: United States
- Language: English

Riding with Buffalo Bill is a 1954 American Western Serial film directed by Spencer Gordon Bennet and starring Marshall Reed.

== Plot ==
Buffalo Bill Cody comes to aid the miner Rocky Ford and a group of ranchers in their defeat of a local crime lord, King Carney, who is trying to keep the new railroad out of the territory in order to carry on with his illegal operations. Rocky then asks Cody to don the disguise of a legendary masked man, known as The Ridin' Terror, who once before smashed outlaw rule in the area. In response, Cody enlists the support of Rocky, the settler Reb Morgan and his sister Ruth, and plans offensive strategy to eradicate Carney and his outlaws.

== Cast ==
- Marshall Reed as Buffalo Bill, "The Ridin' Terror"
- Rick Vallin as Reb Morgan
- Joanne Rio as Maria Perez [ch 7–11, 14-15]
- Shirley Whitney as Ruth Morgan
- Jack Ingram as Henchman Ace
- William Fawcett as Rocky Ford
- Gregg Barton as Henchman Bart
- Edward Coch as Jose Perez [ch 7–11, 14-15] (as Ed Coch)
- Steven Ritch as Henchman Elko [ch 5] (as Steve Ritch)
- Pierce Lyden as Henchman Darr
- Michael Fox as King Carney
- Lee Roberts as Zeke

== Production ==
Riding with Buffalo Bill was the first of producer Sam Katzman's four ultra-low-budget adventure serials, filmed in the twilight of serial production. Most of the action scenes were lifted from older Columbia serials, with new leading men wearing the same costumes to match the old footage.

In late 1953 producer Sam Katzman announced that he was canceling serial production, only to reconsider after a host of exhibitors deluged Katzman with letters of protest. This was front-page news in Variety. Katzman, who had already written off the serials from his budgetary plans, now had to fit them back in, squeezing the time and money tighter than ever. Instead of making more new productions from scratch, he slashed the budgets and production schedules to all-time lows for Riding with Buffalo Bill (1954) and Adventures of Captain Africa (1955), and even further for Perils of the Wilderness (1956) and Blazing the Overland Trail (1956). Columbia then discontinued the production of new serials, and reissued old ones through 1966.

== Chapter titles ==
1. The Ridin' Terror from St. Joe
2. Law of the Six Gun
3. Raiders from Ghost Town
4. Cody to the Rescue
5. Midnight Marauders
6. Under the Avalanche
7. Night Attack
8. Trapped in the Powder Shack
9. Into an Outlaw Trap
10. Blast of Oblivion
11. The Depths of the Earth
12. The Ridin' Terror
13. Trapped in the Apache Mine
14. Railroad Wreckers
15. Law Comes to the West

_{Source:}

== See also ==
- List of American films of 1954
- List of film serials by year
- List of film serials by studio

Preceded by Gunfighters of the Northwest (1954)	Columbia Serial; Riding with Buffalo Bill (1954)	Succeeded by The Adventures of Captain Africa (1955)
