= Bernie Fuchs =

American illustrator (1932–2009)

Bernie Fuchs (October 29, 1932 – September 17, 2009) was an American illustrator widely known for advertising art, magazine illustration and portraiture, including for a series of U.S. postage stamps.

== Background ==
Born in O'Fallon, Illinois, on October 29, 1932, Fuchs grew up in humble circumstances without a father. His ambition was to be a trumpet player, but that ended after he lost three fingers on his right hand in an industrial accident the summer after he graduated from high school. Fuchs turned to art as a career, despite having had no formal art training. He enrolled in Washington University in St. Louis, Missouri, where he graduated in 1954.

Fuchs married his high school sweetheart, Anna Lee Hesse, with whom he had three children: Cynthia, Derek, and Ellise. He died September 17, 2009, of esophageal cancer at a Fairfield, Connecticut care facility, at age 76.

== Career ==
His first job was illustrating car advertisements for New Center Studios, located first in the Fisher Bldg., then in the Penobscot Bldg in Detroit. Art Greenwald was the owner of the studio. It was the largest and most successful studio in Detroit in the 1950s and 1960s. A couple of the other illustrators were Chic Albertson and Donald Silverstein. Bernie was recognized immediately for his incredible talent and pulled in major accounts for Greenwald. Within a few years of moving to Detroit, Fuchs' opened the studio The Art Group, which specialized in work for the city's auto companies. In the late 1950s, Fuchs moved to Westport, Connecticut, where he began doing illustrations for McCalls, Redbook, The Ladies Home Journal, Sports Illustrated and other magazines.

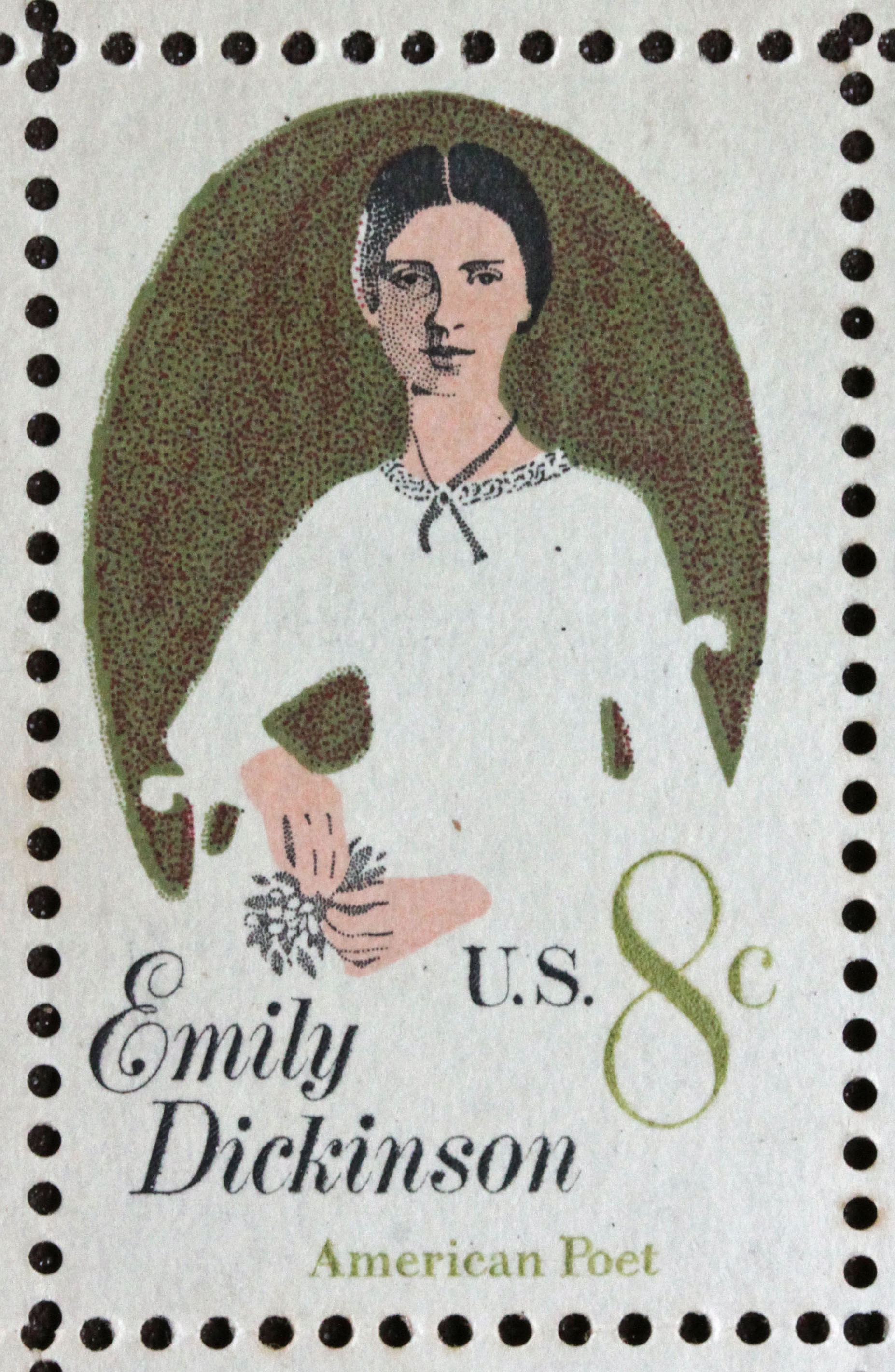
Emily Dickinson commemorative stamp designed by Fuchs, 1971

An 8-cent commemorative stamp in honor of Emily Dickinson, designed by Fuchs, was issued by the United States Postal Service on August 28, 1971, as the second stamp in the "American Poet" series.

Fuchs was also commissioned for the illustration of four U.S. postage stamps released in 1998. The stamps featured folk musicians Huddie "Leadbelly" Ledbetter, Woody Guthrie, Sonny Terry, and Josh White. Fuchs also illustrated several children's picture books, including Ragtime Tumpie and Carolina Shout!, both written by Alan Schroeder.

He painted portraits of several U.S. Presidents, including John F. Kennedy, Lyndon Johnson, Gerald Ford, Jimmy Carter and Ronald Reagan, as well as of such athletes and celebrities such as Muhammad Ali, Arnold Palmer, Jack Nicklaus, Ted Koppel and Katharine Hepburn as well as illustrations of Carol Burnett for the title card for her show.

== Awards ==
Fuchs was the youngest illustrator ever elected to the Society of Illustrators Hall of Fame.

In 1991, Fuchs was named Sport Artist of the Year by the American Sport Art Museum and Archives.

The children's book Ragtime Tumpie by Fuchs and Alan Schroeder was cited as an American Library Association Notable Children's Book in 1989. It was also an International Reading Association Teachers' Choice. Fuchs and Schroeder also collaborated on the 1994 picture book "Carolina Shout!"

== See also ==
- List of TV Guide covers
