= Mark English (illustrator) =

American illustrator and painter (1933–2019)

- Born: September 19, 1933; Hubbard, Texas, American
- Died: August 8, 2019 (aged 85)
- Occupations: Illustrator and Painter
- Known for: one of the United States' leading illustrators for publications

Mark English (September 19, 1933 – August 8, 2019) was an American illustrator and painter, born in Hubbard, Texas. He was one of the United States' leading illustrators for publications in a career spanning from the 1960s to the 1990s, before beginning a career painting for gallery exhibition in 1995.

== Life ==
Mark English was born on September 19, 1933, in Hubbard, Texas. He attended the Hubbard High School and graduated in 1951, after which he enrolled into the University of Texas. He was then drafted into the military during the Korean War. In 1954, English married his first wife, Peggy Ann Littlejohn. In 1960, Mark graduated with honours from The Art Center College of Design in Pasadena, California, with a BFA in Advertising Design. After gaining work experience in advertising agencies for the automobile industry, English and his family moved to Connecticut in 1964. He began an illustrious career, working with publications such as TIME Magazine and Sports Illustrated among others in the corporate, pharmaceutical, music and postage industry. In 1977, Hallmark Cards offered Mark an Artist-in-Residency to teach classes to its creative staff in Kansas City. It was there that he met his second wife, Wendy Buskey, and they married in 1983. In 1995, English retired from illustrations and began to paint for galleries in earnest. The same year, English and his son John co-founded the Illustration Academy, an art and design workshop catering to students and professionals. From 1999 onwards, English's work and paintings were exhibited in galleries across the United States and in London. His last exhibition was in 2017 at the Eva Reynolds Fine Arts Gallery () which was a comprehensive exhibition of his works both as an illustrator and a painter. Before his death, English was living in Kansas City with his wife.

On August 8, 2019, Mark English died peacefully, "after a brief illness" in Kansas City. He left behind four daughters; Donna, Stephanie, Emily, and Sarah, and a son, John.

== Career ==
English's unique illustration style appeared in publications as TIME, Sports Illustrated, Redbook, Atlantic Monthly, Rolling Stone, McCalls, and many other corporate and pharmaceutical publications. He designed 14 stamps for the U.S. Postal Service, movie posters and album covers for John Denver, Julian Lennon, and The Who.

In painting, English showcases his style in a variety of subjects, from figures, animals and florals to landscape and architecture. His paintings have been exhibited worldwide in galleries such as the Eleanor Ettinger Gallery in New York, Albemarle Gallery in London, Maxwell Gallery in San Francisco, and have been the subject to publication in four books, available on his website.

== Teaching ==
The workshop’s structure and teaching approach later informed the development of Visual Arts Passage, which Timmy Trabon and John English created in collaboration with him to extend that educational model into an online format.

== Awards ==
He has won hundreds of awards for his work and has been the most awarded illustrator in the history of the Society of Illustrators in New York City. including the 1967 Hamilton King Award from said Society of Illustrators.

- 1983 - elected to The New York Society of Illustrators’ Hall of Fame.
- 2001 - awarded an Honorary Doctor of Humane Letters from The Academy of Art University, San Francisco.

== Clients ==
- IBM
- U.S. Park Service
- RCA
- GE
- Ford
- GM
- Honeywell

== See also ==
- List of TV Guide covers
