= Steven Chorney =

American graphic designer and illustrator

- Born: 1951 (age 74–75)
- Occupation: Graphic Designer
- Website: www.stevenchorney.com

Steven Chorney (born 1951 in Washington, D.C.) is an American artist, graphic designer and illustrator with a primary focus in the motion picture industry.

== Biography ==
=== Early life and career ===
Chorney was born in Washington, D.C. and raised in Buffalo, New York. Having had no formal art education, he moved to Southern California in 1971 to pursue his dream of becoming a visual artist. "My father was trained as a commercial artist in Toronto, Ontario, Canada. It may be said that he made the largest impact on my decision to follow this chosen field."

Chorney landed a position with a small independent agency on the Sunset Strip in Hollywood, animating and designing television commercials. In 1976, his entry to the Chicago International Film Festival garnered the First Place Award for Animated Television Commercials.

Later, while creating numerous freelance assignments for the recording industry the marketing departments of some of the major Hollywood studios began to take note. "A turning point came" relates the artist, "with the creation of a movie poster design for the film Lassiter starring Tom Selleck and Jane Seymour." The bold approach was a departure from the standard montage often seen. Others took note as well, and the assignments began to come in. "I like to think it was something I did...but more truthfully, I was in the right place at the right time," he said.

=== Later career ===
Over the 1983-86 period, Chorney created dramatic illustrations for over 50 TV Guide advertisements for CBS and NBC television programs, including, Airwolf, Dynasty, Miami Vice, Mickey Spillane's Mike Hammer, Private Eye, T.J. Hooker, and Cagney and Lacey. In 1987 his work on the popular television series Designing Women won First Place in The Hollywood Reporter Key Art Awards for Television. The artist's drawing skills and dramatic technique have been applied to over 120 motion picture campaigns for many of the major studios including Disney, MGM, Universal and Warner Bros. As an example, the artwork for the poster Stakeout highlights Steven's skills as a motion picture industry illustrator working under pressure with tight deadlines in a production environment.

Recognized for his design and conceptual abilities, Chorney was frequently enlisted to develop the preliminary designs for the final movie posters on films as diverse as Who Framed Roger Rabbit, the James Bond film Licence to Kill, Indiana Jones and the Last Crusade, and many more.

In 2014, Chorney’s illustrations were used in the promotional campaign for the film Inherent Vice; his work, along with the creative design team at BLT Communications, Ltd, was awarded three Clio Entertainment Awards (1 Grand, 2 Gold), for the Domestic One-Sheet Poster, Illustrated Character Campaign, and Dimensional Billboard.

== Present ==
Still working, the artist's paintings may be seen illustrating magazine covers and books such as the popular Star Wars young reader series and others. In addition, Steve Chorney has been creating works for Universal Parks & Resorts, Paramount Parks, Disney Parks, numerous State Tourist attractions, as well as private commissions and Gallery works. He currently lives in Hollywood, California. He designed the poster for the 2019 film, Once Upon a Time in Hollywood. Alongside Renato Casaro, Chorney designed several of the mock posters featured in the film.

== Awards ==
- Chicago International Film Festival, First Place Award for Animated Television Commercials, 1976.
- The Hollywood Reporter, Key Art Award, Television, Steven Chorney, Designing Women, 1987.
