= Raymond Ameijide =

American illustrator and graphic designer

- Born: September 14, 1924; Newark, New Jersey, U.S.
- Died: January 11, 2000 (aged 75); Cortlandt Manor, New York, U.S
- Occupation: Graphic designer

Raymond Ameijide (September 14, 1924 – January 11, 2000), sometimes credited as R. Ameijide, was an American illustrator and graphic designer. He served with the U.S. Armed Forces during World War II before becoming a graphic designer in the 1950s.

Ameijide served as an illustrator a variety of clients, including Fortune, National Geographic, IBM, Pfizer, TV Guide, Chase Manhattan, Discover, Harcourt Brace and the United States Post Office. He won numerous awards for his illustrations from various organizations and clubs, such as the Art Directors Club. His work is honored by the book The Illustrator In America 1880–1980 A Century of Illustration by Walt and Roger Reed.

Ameijide employed 3-D layering of cutouts of various colored papers to create his caricatures, having originated and developed paper and felt sculptures, which were then photographed, as illustrations in the mid-1950s.
