= List of TV Guide covers =

This is a portal to a series of articles listing the many issue covers of TV Guide magazine since its national launch in the spring of 1953. The articles are separated by decades:

- The 1950s (beginning April 1953)
- The 1960s (1960–1969)
- The 1970s (1970–1979)
- The 1980s (1980–1989)
- The 1990s (1990–1999)
- The 2000s (2000–2009)
- The 2010s (2010–2019)
- The 2020s (2020–present)

These articles are for the regular weekly issues of TV Guide, and do not include any one-time-only special issues. The lists include covers that are national or regional in nature, as well as any covers that were available exclusively to subscribers. The Canadian edition of TV Guide featured mostly the same covers until it separated into its own publication in the 1980s; those covers are not included.

== Sources ==
- Covers and table of contents page descriptions for the various issues.
- TV Guide: Fifty Years of Television, New York, NY: Crown Publishers, 2002. ISBN 1-4000-4685-8
- Stephen Hofer, ed., TV Guide: The Official Collectors Guide, Braintree, Mass.: BangZoom Publishers, 2006. ISBN 0-9772927-1-1.
