= List of TV Guide covers (1950s) =

This is a list of issue covers of TV Guide magazine for the decade of the 1950s, from its national launch in April 1953 through December 1959. The entries on this table include each cover's subjects and their artists (photographer or illustrator). This list is for the regular weekly issues of TV Guide; any one-time-only special issues are not included. From April 3, 1953 to July 9, 1954, the magazine organized their TV listings from Friday to Thursday. Starting July 17, 1954, the pattern was reorganized in order from Saturday to Friday and would be done in this manner until April 3, 2004.

== 1953 ==
Issue date	Cover subject	Cover type	Artist
4/3/1953	Desiderio Alberto Arnaz IV (using Desi Arnaz Jr.'s legal name) & uncaptioned inset photo of Lucille Ball	Photo montage	Unknown
4/10/1953	Dragnet's Jack Webb		
4/17/1953	Uncaptioned Lucille Ball, Arthur Godfrey, Milton Berle, Imogene Coca & Sid Caesar	Illustration	Jack Weaver
4/24/1953	Ralph Edwards		
5/1/1953	Eve Arden		
5/8/1953	Arthur Godfrey	Photograph	
5/15/1953	David & Ricky Nelson		
5/22/1953	Uncaptioned Red Buttons		
5/29/1953	Uncaptioned Queen Elizabeth II		
6/5/1953	Jerry Lewis & Dean Martin		
6/12/1953	Eddie Fisher		
6/19/1953	Ed Sullivan		
6/26/1953	Dinah Shore		
7/3/1953	Uncaptioned Perry Como		
7/10/1953	Dave Garroway & Mr. Muggs		
7/17/1953	Uncaptioned Lucille Ball & Desi Arnaz		
7/24/1953	Uncaptioned Groucho Marx	Illustration	Bob Taylor
7/31/1953	Max Liebman, Sid Caesar & Imogene Coca		
8/7/1953	Ray Milland: Moves to TV		
8/14/1953	Patti Page		
8/21/1953	Super Circus Mary Hartline & Claude Kirchner	Photo illustration	
8/28/1953	Uncaptioned Jayne Meadows & Audrey Meadows		
9/4/1953	Back to School With Mr. Peepers/Uncaptioned Marion Lorne & Wally Cox	Illustration	
9/11/1953	Joan Caulfield & Ralph Edwards This Is Your Life	Photograph	
9/18/1953	Fall Preview 1953–1954 Shows		
9/25/1953	George Reeves — — Man and Superman	Photo montage	
10/2/1953	Red Skelton: A Career at Stake		
10/9/1953	Preview: Bishop Sheen's New Book		
10/16/1953	Picture Story — 1953 T-Venus Winners (Three uncaptioned actresses, one of whom is Angie Dickinson)	Photograph	
10/23/1953	Arthur Godfrey	Photo montage	
10/30/1953	Buelah Witch & Friends	Illustration	
11/6/1953	Warren Hull		
11/13/1953	Jimmy Durante		
11/20/1953	Dorothy McGuire & Julius La Rosa		
11/27/1953	Lugene Sanders — 'Babs Riley'		
12/4/1953	Loretta Young		
12/11/1953	Jack Webb: Quitting Dragnet		
12/18/1953	Bob Hope: On The Run	Photo illustration	
12/25/1953	Merry Christmas with uncaptioned Perry Como, Patti Page & Eddie Fisher		

== 1954 ==
Issue date	Cover subject	Cover type	Artist
1/1/1954	Bing Crosby	Photograph	
1/8/1954	Joan Caulfield		
1/15/1954	Martha Raye		
1/22/1954	I've Got a Secret		
1/29/1954	Robert Montgomery		
2/5/1954	Jack Benny	Photograph	
2/12/1954	Red Buttons		
2/19/1954	Ann Sothern		
2/26/1954	Liberace	Photograph	
3/5/1954	Marion Marlowe & Frank Parker		
3/12/1954	Maria Riva		
3/19/1954	Groucho Marx		
3/26/1954	Jackie Gleason	Photograph	William Kahn
4/2/1954	Eve Arden		
4/9/1954	Charlie Applewhite & Milton Berle		
4/16/1954	TV Guide Awards		
4/23/1954	Lucille Ball	Photograph	
4/30/1954	Ben Alexander & Jack Webb		
5/7/1954	Nelsons — Mother (Harriet Nelson) & Sons (Ricky Nelson & David Nelson)		
5/14/1954	Frank Sinatra	Photograph	
5/21/1954	Patricia Benoit & Wally Cox		
5/28/1954	Gale Storm		
6/4/1954	Arthur Godfrey		
6/11/1954	Ben Blue & Alan Young		
6/18/1954	Rise Stevens & Ed Sullivan		
6/25/1954	Howdy Doody & Bob Smith	Photograph	
7/2/1954	Joan Davis & Jim Backus		
7/9/1954	Arlene Francis		
7/17/1954	Roy Rogers		
7/24/1954	Jack Webb & Ann Robinson		
7/31/1954	William Bendix		
8/7/1954	Perry Como & Friends		
8/14/1954	Dean Martin & Jerry Lewis	Photograph	
8/21/1954	Jayne Meadows & Steve Allen		
8/28/1954	Roxanne		
9/4/1954	Eddie Fisher		
9/11/1954	Betty Hutton		
9/18/1954	Liberace		
9/25/1954	Fall Preview 1954–1955 Shows	Text graphic	
10/2/1954	Teresa Wright & Dick Powell in The Long Goodbye		
10/9/1954	Lucille Ball		
10/16/1954	Red Buttons	Photograph	
10/23/1954	Walt Disney with his studio's cartoon characters	Photo illustration	Walt Disney Productions
10/30/1954	Joan Caulfield & Barry Nelson		
11/6/1954	Gracie Allen & George Burns		
11/13/1954	Joanne Rio & Liberace		
11/20/1954	Bebe Daniels & Ralph Edwards		
11/27/1954	Peter Lawford & Marcia Henderson		
12/4/1954	George Gobel		
12/11/1954	Marion Marlowe		
12/18/1954	Imogene Coca		
12/25/1954	Ozzie Nelson & Family		

== 1955 ==
Issue date	Cover subject	Cover type	Artist
1/1/1955	Loretta Young of The Loretta Young Show	Photograph	Elmer Holloway
1/8/1955	Arthur Godfrey		
1/15/1955	I've Got a Secret		
1/22/1955	Ed Sullivan		
1/29/1955	Martha Raye		
2/5/1955	Edward R. Murrow		
2/12/1955	Your Hit Parade		
2/19/1955	Sid Caesar	Photograph	Philippe Halsman
2/26/1955	Steve Allen & Judy Holliday		
3/5/1955	Liberace		
3/12/1955	Dinah Shore		
3/19/1955	Art Carney		
3/26/1955	Gale Gordon & Eve Arden		
4/2/1955	Tony Martin		
4/9/1955	Gloria Marshall & Bob Cummings		
4/16/1955	Garry Moore		
4/23/1955	Gale Storm		
4/30/1955	Buddy Ebsen & Fess Parker		
5/7/1955	Robin Morgan & Peggy Wood		
5/14/1955	Perry Como		
5/21/1955	Audrey Meadows & Jackie Gleason		
5/28/1955	Ralph Edwards		
6/4/1955	Eddie Fisher		
6/11/1955	Gail Davis		
6/18/1955	Danny Thomas		
6/25/1955	Sid Caesar, Barbara Nichols & Cliff Norton		
7/2/1955	Tommy Rettig with Lassie & Lee Aaker with Rin Tin Tin	Photograph	Graphic House
7/9/1955	Patti Page		
7/16/1955	Julius La Rosa		
7/23/1955	Janet Leigh & Jack Webb		
7/30/1955	Lucille Ball, Desi Arnaz, Margaret Whiting & Barbara Whiting		
8/6/1955	Art Linkletter		
8/13/1955	Roxanne & Bud Collyer		
8/20/1955	Hal March		
8/27/1955	Groucho Marx		
9/3/1955	Jody Carson & Johnny Carson of The Johnny Carson Show	Photograph	Gaby Rona
9/10/1955	Arthur Godfrey		
9/17/1955	Milton Berle & Esther Williams		
9/24/1955	Fall preview 1955–1956 Shows	Illustration	
10/1/1955	Mickey Mouse		
10/8/1955	George Burns & Gracie Allen		
10/15/1955	Richard Boone		
10/22/1955	Peggy King & George Gobel		
10/29/1955	Phil Silvers	Photograph	Philippe Halsman
11/5/1955	Nanette Fabray		
11/12/1955	Liberace		
11/19/1955	Jack Benny		
11/26/1955	Martha Raye of The Martha Raye Show with her head leaning out of a picture frame	Photograph	Philippe Halsman
12/3/1955	Mary Healy & Peter Lind Hayes		
12/10/1955	Lucille Ball		
12/17/1955	Robert Montgomery		
12/24/1955	A Christmas image of a TV antenna decorated with ornaments and beads	Photograph	Larry Fritz
12/31/1955	Cleo (dog) of The People's Choice		

== 1956 ==
Issue date	Cover subject	Cover type	Artist
1/7/1956	Arthur Godfrey		
1/14/1956	Loretta Young		
1/21/1956	Lawrence Welk		
1/28/1956	Janis Paige		
2/4/1956	Judy Tyler		
2/11/1956	Perry Como		
2/18/1956	Jimmy Durante		
2/25/1956	Gisele MacKenzie		
3/3/1956	Lynn Dollar & Hal March		
3/10/1956	Frances Rafferty & Spring Byington		
3/17/1956	Maurice Evans & Lilli Palmer		
3/24/1956	Dave Garroway		
3/31/1956	Arlene Francis & John Daly		
4/7/1956	Jayne Meadows, Garry Moore & Faye Emerson		
4/14/1956	Grace Kelly		
4/21/1956	Nanette Fabray		
4/28/1956	Red Skelton		
5/5/1956	George Gobel & Mitzi Gaynor		
5/12/1956	Bernadette O'Farrell & Richard Greene		
5/19/1956	Phil Silvers & Elisabeth Fraser		
5/26/1956	Alice Lon & Lawrence Welk		
6/2/1956	Sid Caesar & Janet Blair		
6/9/1956	Patti Page		
6/16/1956	Elinor Donahue, Robert Young, Lauren Chapin & Billy Gray		
6/23/1956	Steve Allen		
6/30/1956	Bob Cummings		
7/7/1956	Lassie	Photograph	Garrett-Howard
7/14/1956	Gordon MacRae & Sheila MacRae		
7/21/1956	Bill Lundigan & Mary Costa		
7/28/1956	Gail Davis of Annie Oakley	Photograph	Garrett-Howard
8/4/1956	Jackie Cooper & Cleo (dog)		
8/11/1956	Democratic Convention	Illustration	KMLG-Barron
8/18/1956	GOP Convention	Illustration	Kramer, Miller, Lomden, Glassman
8/25/1956	Esther Williams		
9/1/1956	Alice Lon		
9/8/1956	Elvis Presley		
9/15/1956	Fall Preview 1956–1957 Shows		
9/22/1956	Hal March	Illustration	Al Hirschfeld
9/29/1956	Jackie Gleason		
10/6/1956	Gale Storm		
10/13/1956	The Nelson Family		
10/20/1956	Phyllis Goodkind & Perry Como		
10/27/1956	Alfred Hitchcock		
11/3/1956	Edward R. Murrow	Illustration	Al Hirschfeld
11/10/1956	Loretta Young	Photograph	Elmer Holloway
11/17/1956	Buddy Hackett		
11/24/1956	Nanette Fabray		
12/1/1956	Gracie Allen & George Burns	Illustration	Al Hirschfeld
12/8/1956	Victor Borge		
12/15/1956	Dinah Shore		
12/22/1956	Merry Christmas		
12/29/1956	Jeannie Carson		

== 1957 ==
Issue date	Cover subject	Cover type	Artist
1/5/1957	Arthur Godfrey	Illustration	Al Hirschfeld
1/12/1957	Lucille Ball		
1/19/1957	Jerry Lewis		
1/26/1957	Bob Hope	Illustration	Al Hirschfeld
2/2/1957	Jane Wyman		
2/9/1957	Hugh O'Brian		
2/16/1957	Jane Wyatt & Robert Young		
2/23/1957	Charles Van Doren		
3/2/1957	Dorothy Collins & Gisele MacKenzie		
3/9/1957	Arthur Godfrey & Pat Boone		
3/16/1957	The Emmy Awards		
3/23/1957	Tennessee Ernie Ford	Illustration	Ernest Chiriaka
3/30/1957	Julie Andrews		
4/6/1957	Lawrence Welk	Illustration	Al Hirschfeld
4/13/1957	Nanette Fabray of The Kaiser Aluminum Hour in a baseball uniform (a baseball preview feature was included in this issue)	Photograph	Herb Ball
4/20/1957	Loretta Young		
4/27/1957	Groucho Marx	Illustration	Al Parker
5/4/1957	Hal March & Robert Strom		
5/11/1957	James Arness of Gunsmoke	Photograph	Garrett-Howard
5/18/1957	Esther Williams		
5/25/1957	Sid Caesar	Illustration	Al Hirschfeld
6/1/1957	Ida Lupino & Howard Duff		
6/8/1957	Lassie		
6/15/1957	Red Skelton		
6/22/1957	Jack Bailey		
6/29/1957	Gale Storm		
7/6/1957	What's My Line?	Illustration	Al Hirschfeld
7/13/1957	Gail Davis		
7/20/1957	Julius La Rosa		
7/27/1957	Garry Moore		
8/3/1957	Cleo (dog)		
8/10/1957	Ann B. Davis & Bob Cummings		
8/17/1957	Phil Silvers	Illustration	Al Hirschfeld
8/24/1957	Marjorie Lord & Danny Thomas		
8/31/1957	Clint Walker of Cheyenne	Photograph	Warner Bros.
9/7/1957	Janette Davis & Arthur Godfrey		
9/14/1957	Fall Preview 1957–1958 Shows featuring a close-up of the eye of Polly Bergen	Photograph	Arthur Williams
9/21/1957	Pat Boone		
9/28/1957	Gracie Allen & George Burns		
10/5/1957	Joan Caulfield		
10/12/1957	This Is The Week To Watch	Photo montage	
10/19/1957	Loretta Young		
10/26/1957	Peter Lawford & Phyllis Kirk		
11/2/1957	Lucille Ball	Illustration	Al Hirschfeld
11/9/1957	James Garner		
11/16/1957	Patti Page		
11/23/1957	Mary Martin		
11/30/1957	Alfred Hitchcock	Illustration	Al Hirschfeld
12/7/1957	Dinah Shore	Illustration	Al Parker
12/14/1957	Walt Disney		
12/21/1957	Season's Greetings		
12/28/1957	Ricky Nelson of The Adventures of Ozzie & Harriet	Photograph	John Engstead

== 1958 ==
Issue date	Cover subject	Cover type	Artist
1/4/1958	Lawrence Welk		
1/11/1958	Gisele MacKenzie		
1/18/1958	John Payne		
1/25/1958	Sid Caesar & Imogene Coca	Photograph	Philippe Halsman
2/1/1958	Walter Winchell		
2/8/1958	Peggy King & Tab Hunter		
2/15/1958	A Great Week		
2/22/1958	Rosemary Clooney		
3/1/1958	Lassie	Illustration	Al Hirschfeld
3/8/1958	Arthur Godfrey		
3/15/1958	Amanda Blake & James Arness		
3/22/1958	Perry Como	Illustration	Al Hirschfeld
3/29/1958	Tennessee Ernie Ford	Photograph	Paul W. Bailey
4/5/1958	Gale Storm		
4/12/1958	Hugh O'Brian	Illustration	Al Hirschfeld
4/19/1958	Polly Bergen		
4/26/1958	Guy Williams of Zorro	Photograph	Dave Preston
5/3/1958	Shirley Temple		
5/10/1958	Richard Boone of Have Gun Will Travel	Photograph	Philippe Halsman
5/17/1958	Danny Thomas		
5/24/1958	Dick Clark		
5/31/1958	Phyllis Kirk		
6/7/1958	Pat Boone		
6/14/1958	Jane Wyatt & Robert Young		
6/21/1958	Ed Sullivan		
6/28/1958	Jerry Mathers		
7/5/1958	Bill Cullen of The Price Is Right		
7/12/1958	Lucille Ball		
7/19/1958	Dale Robertson		
7/26/1958	Paula Raymond & Marvin Miller		
8/2/1958	Walter Brennan		
8/9/1958	Steve Lawrence & Eydie Gorme		
8/16/1958	Robert Horton & Ward Bond		
8/23/1958	Edie Adams & Janet Blair		
8/30/1958	Bud Collyer, Polly Bergen & Kitty Carlisle		
9/6/1958	Arthur Godfrey		
9/13/1958	Lennon Sisters & Lawrence Welk		
9/20/1958	Fall Preview 1958–1959 Shows		
9/27/1958	Garry Moore		
10/4/1958	Dick Clark		
10/11/1958	Barrie Chase & Fred Astaire		
10/18/1958	Perry Como		
10/25/1958	George Burns		
11/1/1958	Jack Paar		
11/8/1958	Loretta Young		
11/15/1958	Warner Anderson & Tom Tully		
11/22/1958	Ronald Reagan & Nancy Reagan	Photograph	Garrett-Howard
11/29/1958	Victor Borge		
12/6/1958	James Arness		
12/13/1958	Danny Thomas		
12/20/1958	Special Holiday Issue		
12/27/1958	David Nelson & Ricky Nelson		

== 1959 ==
Issue date	Cover subject	Cover type	Artist
1/3/1959	Lola Albright & Craig Stevens of Peter Gunn	Photograph	
1/10/1959	Milton Berle	Illustration	Al Hirschfeld
1/17/1959	James Garner & Jack Kelly of Maverick	Photograph	Gene Trindl
1/24/1959	Red Skelton of The Red Skelton Show		
1/31/1959	George Gobel of The George Gobel Show		
2/7/1959	Johnny Crawford & Chuck Connors of The Rifleman		
2/14/1959	Alfred Hitchcock of Alfred Hitchcock Presents	Photograph	Max Yavno
2/21/1959	Barbara Hale & Raymond Burr of Perry Mason	Photograph	
2/28/1959	Richard Boone		
3/7/1959	Walter Brennan		
3/14/1959	Arthur Godfrey		
3/21/1959	Ann Sothern		
3/28/1959	Tennessee Ernie Ford of The Ford Show		
4/4/1959	Efrem Zimbalist Jr. & Roger Smith of 77 Sunset Strip		
4/11/1959	Ward Bond		
4/18/1959	Dinah Shore		
4/25/1959	Dick Powell		
5/2/1959	Hugh O'Brian		
5/9/1959	Edward Byrnes		
5/16/1959	Loretta Young		
5/23/1959	Bob Hope		
5/30/1959	Steve McQueen of Wanted: Dead or Alive	Photograph	Gene Trindl
6/6/1959	Gale Storm		
6/13/1959	Pat Boone		
6/20/1959	Robert Young & Lauren Chapin		
6/27/1959	Lloyd Bridges of Sea Hunt	Photograph	Russ Halford
7/4/1959	Jon Provost & Lassie		
7/11/1959	Lola Albright & Craig Stevens		
7/18/1959	Janet Blair		
7/25/1959	John Russell		
8/1/1959	Dave Garroway		
8/8/1959	Donna Reed		
8/15/1959	Lawrence Welk		
8/22/1959	Bess Myerson, Henry Morgan, Betsy Palmer & Bill Cullen of I've Got a Secret		
8/29/1959	Dick Clark of American Bandstand		
9/5/1959	James Garner & Jack Kelly		
9/12/1959	Arthur Godfrey		
9/19/1959	Fall Preview: 1959–1960 Shows		
9/26/1959	Jackie Cooper & Abby Dalton		
10/3/1959	June Allyson		
10/10/1959	Robert Taylor		
10/17/1959	Ingrid Bergman		
10/24/1959	Jay North alongside the animated Dennis the Menace	Photo Illustration	North: Richard R. Hewett Dennis: Hank Ketcham
10/31/1959	Fred Astaire & Barrie Chase of Another Evening With Fred Astaire	Photograph	Elmer Holloway
11/7/1959	Jack Benny		
11/14/1959	Perry Como		
11/21/1959	Clint Walker of Cheyenne		
11/28/1959	Art Carney		
12/5/1959	Gayle Polayes, Joan Chandler & Dwayne Hickman of The Many Loves of Dobie Gillis	Photograph	Peter Samerjan
12/12/1959	Danny Thomas		
12/19/1959	Merry Christmas		
12/26/1959	Loretta Young		

== Sources ==
- Covers and table of contents page descriptions for the various issues.
- TV Guide cover archive website: 1950s
- TV Guide: Fifty Years of Television, New York, NY: Crown Publishers, 2002. ISBN 1-4000-4685-8
- Stephen Hofer, ed., TV Guide: The Official Collectors Guide, Braintree, Mass.: BangZoom Publishers, 2006. ISBN 0-9772927-1-1.
- "50 Greatest TV Guide Covers," article from the June 15, 2002 edition of TV Guide
- Information from ellwanger.tv's TV Guide collection section
