= 32nd British Academy Film Awards =

1979 film awards ceremony

- Date: 22 March 1979
- Site: Wembley Conference Centre
- Hosted by: Sue Lawley; Michael York

Highlights
- Best Film: Julia
- Best Actor: Richard Dreyfuss; The Goodbye Girl
- Best Actress: Jane Fonda; Julia
- Most awards: Julia (4)
- Most nominations: Julia (10)

The 32nd British Academy Film Awards, more commonly known as the BAFTAs, took place on 22 March 1979 at the Wembley Conference Centre in London, honouring the best national and foreign films of 1978. Presented by the British Academy of Film and Television Arts, accolades were handed out for the best feature-length film and documentaries of any nationality that were screened at British cinemas in 1978.

The film Julia had ten nominations and four awards, including Best Film. Richard Dreyfuss and Jane Fonda took home Best Actor and Actress, whilst John Hurt and Geraldine Page won in the supporting categories.

The ceremony was hosted by Sue Lawley and Michael York.

== Winners and nominees ==
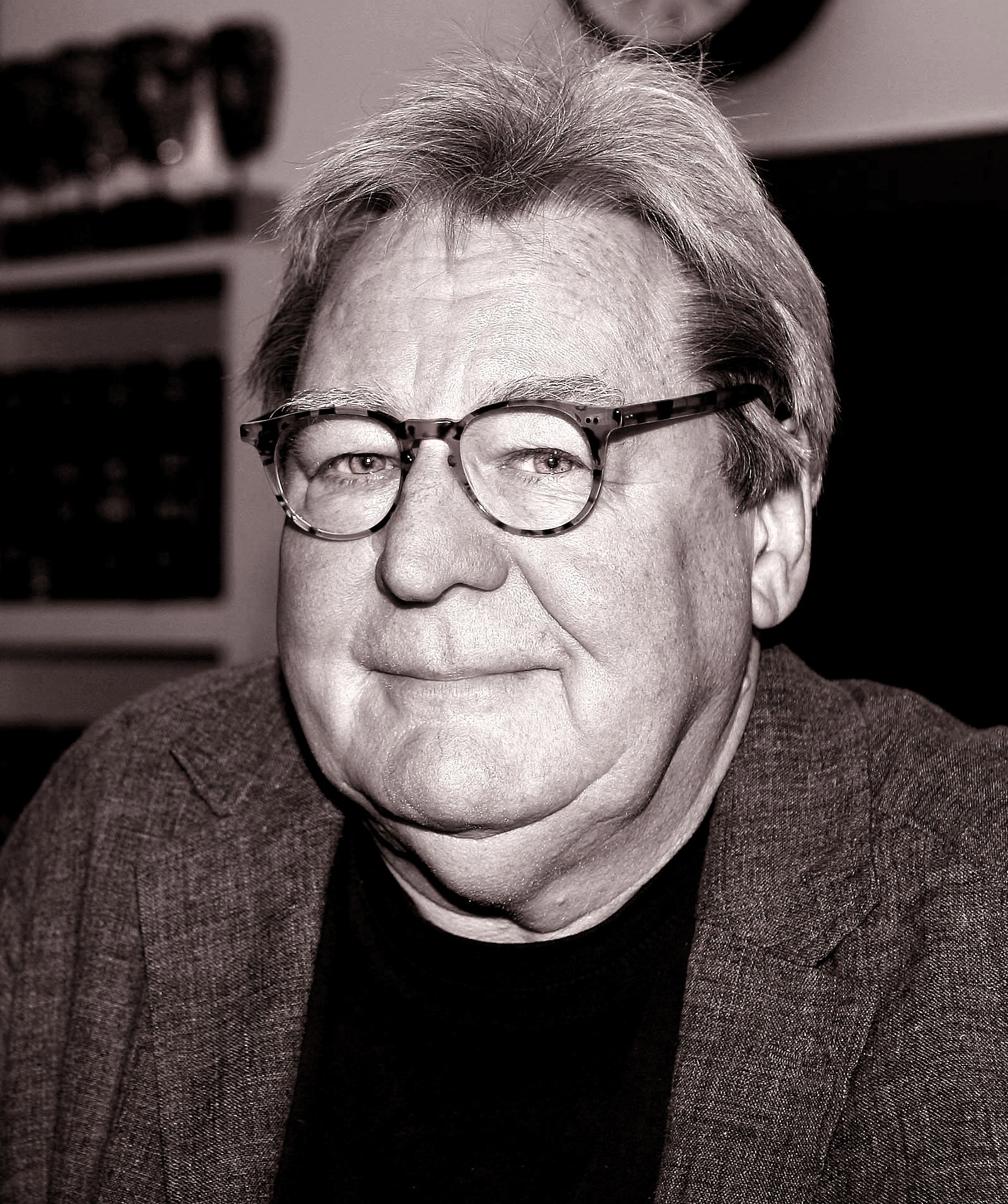
Sir Alan Parker, Best Director winner

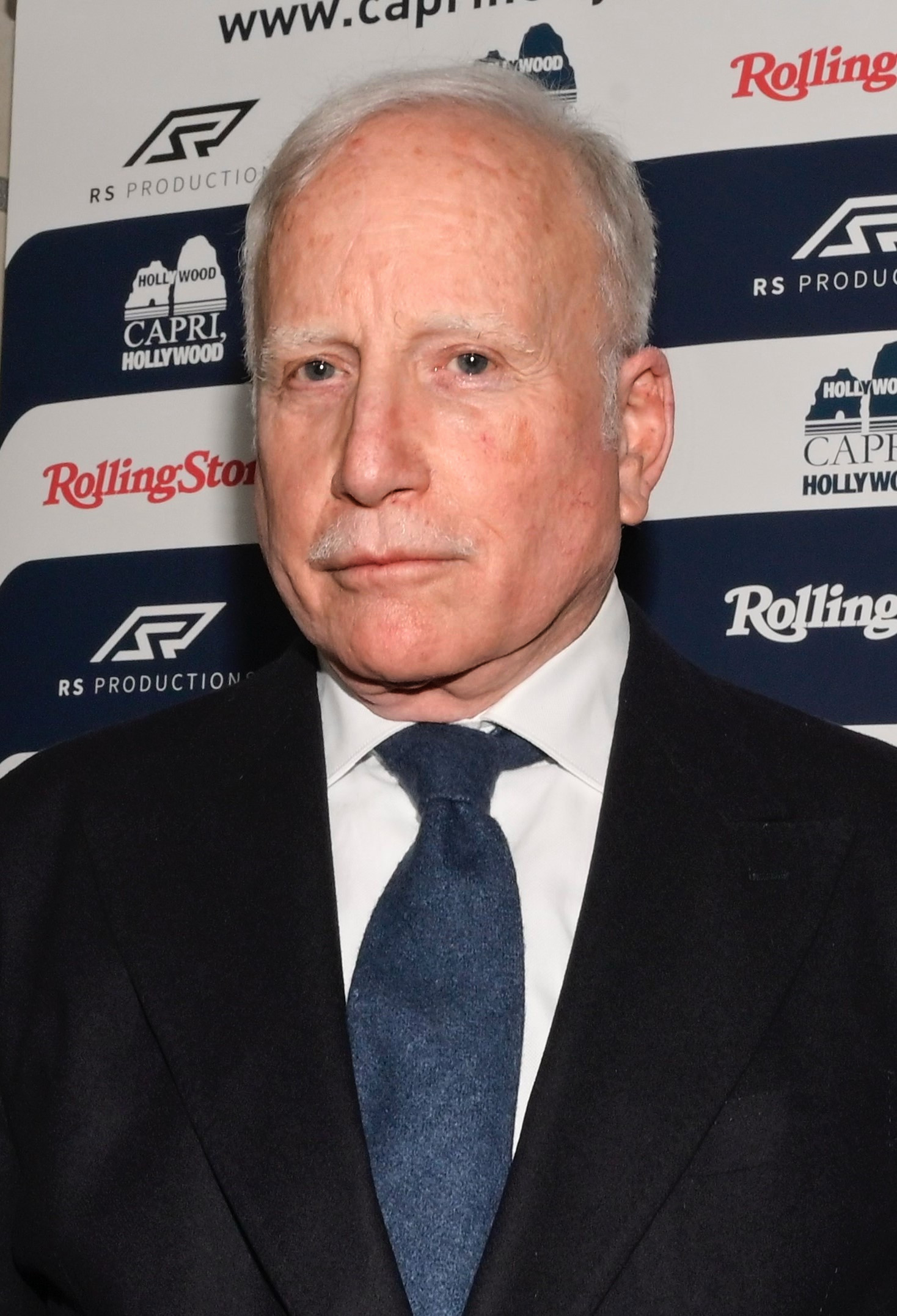
Richard Dreyfuss, Best Actor winner

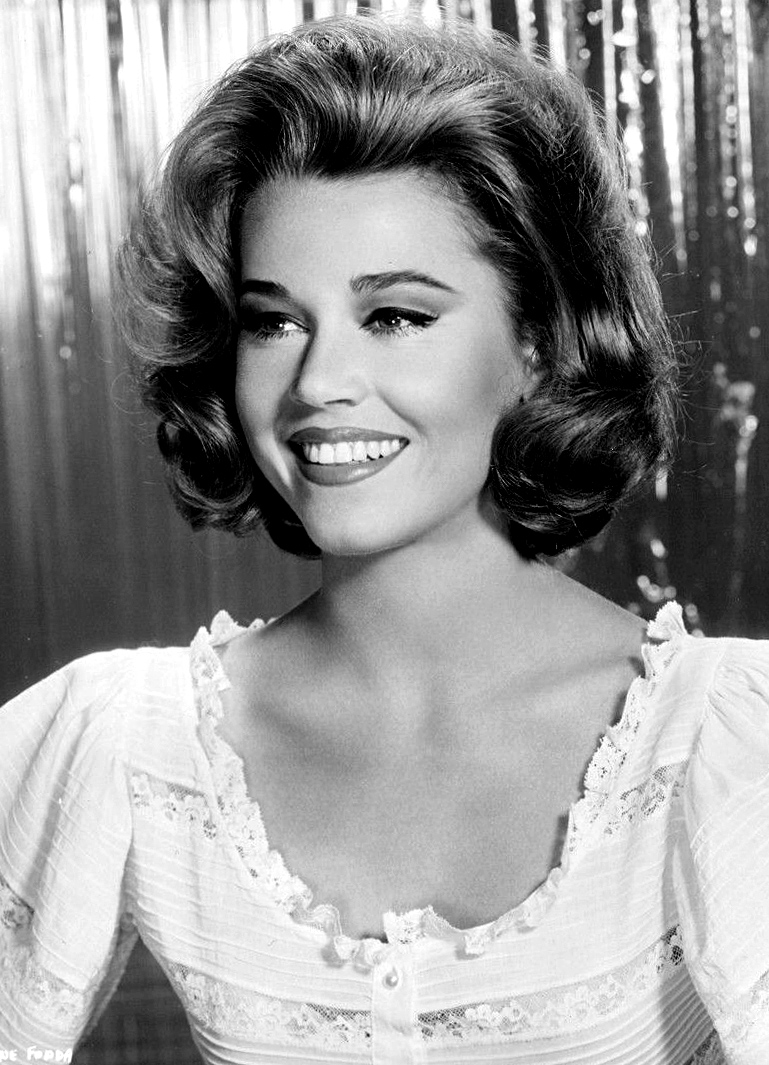
Jane Fonda, Best Actress winner

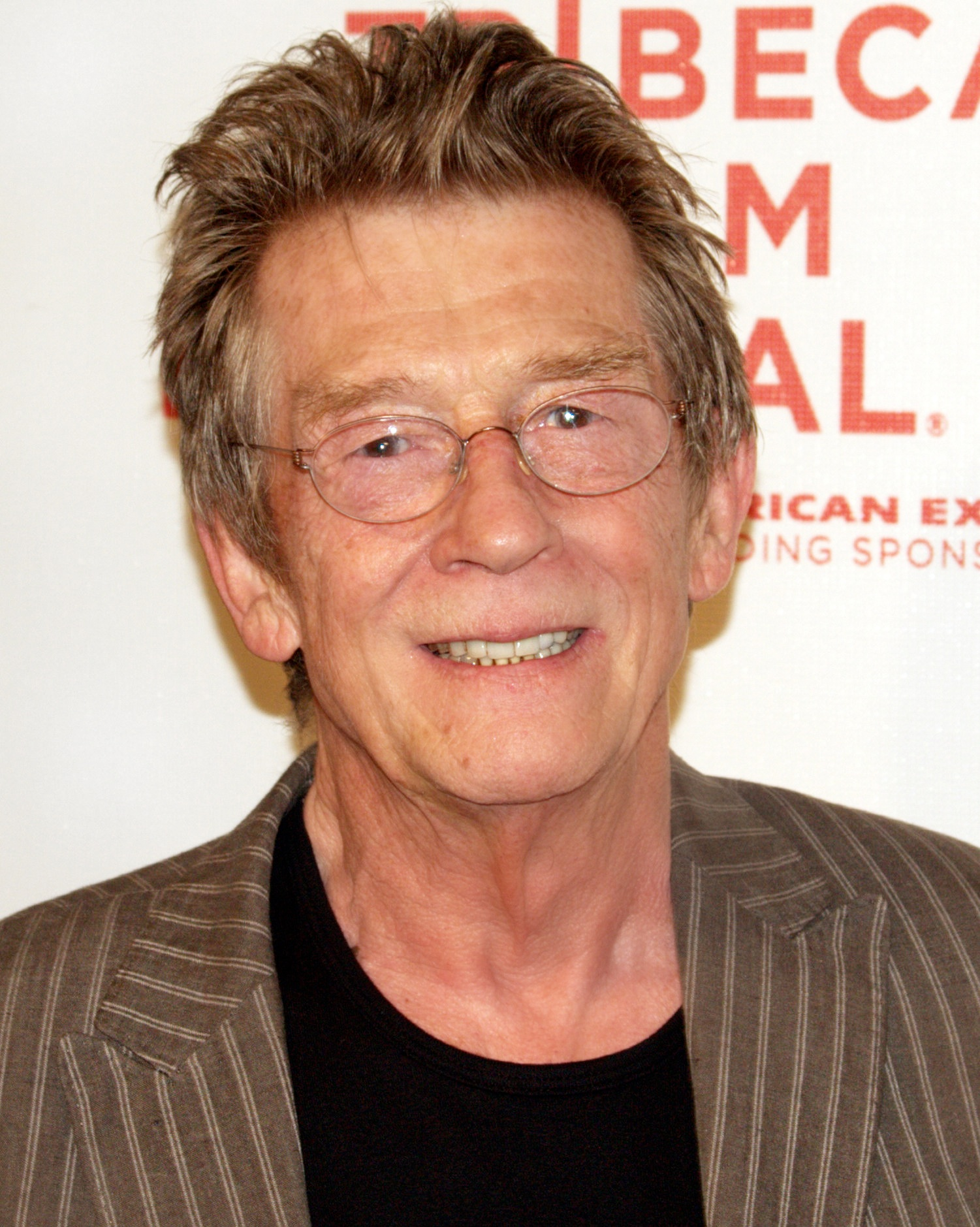
Sir John Hurt, Best Supporting Actor winner

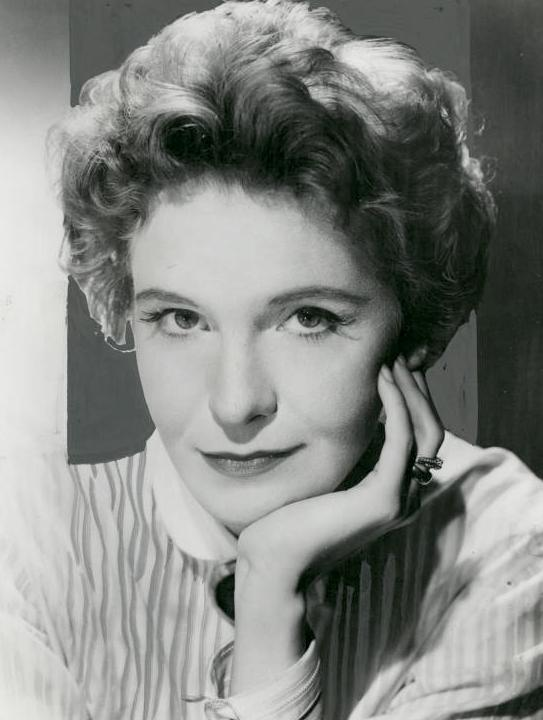
Geraldine Page, Best Supporting Actress winner

=== Outstanding British Contribution to Cinema ===
- **Les Bowie, Colin Chilvers, Denys Coop, Roy Field, Derek Meddings, Zoran Perisic and Wally Veevers** (Special Visual Effects Team – Superman)

=== Awards ===
Winners are listed first and highlighted in boldface.

**Best Film**: **Julia – Fred Zinnemann**; Close Encounters of the Third Kind – Steven Spielberg; Midnight Express – Alan Parker; Star Wars – George Lucas	**Direction**: **Alan Parker – Midnight Express**; Fred Zinnemann – Julia; Robert Altman – A Wedding; Steven Spielberg – Close Encounters of the Third Kind
**Best Actor in a Leading Role**: **Richard Dreyfuss – The Goodbye Girl as Elliot Garfield**; Anthony Hopkins – Magic as Corky Withers; Brad Davis – Midnight Express as Billy Hayes; Peter Ustinov – Death on the Nile as Hercule Poirot	**Best Actress in a Leading Role**: **Jane Fonda – Julia as Lillian Hellman**; Anne Bancroft – The Turning Point as Emma Jacklin; Jill Clayburgh – An Unmarried Woman as Erica Benton; Marsha Mason – The Goodbye Girl as Paula McFadden
**Best Actor in a Supporting Role**: **John Hurt – Midnight Express as Max**; François Truffaut – Close Encounters of the Third Kind as Claude Lacombe; Gene Hackman – Superman as Lex Luthor; Jason Robards – Julia as Dashiell Hammett	**Best Actress in a Supporting Role**: **Geraldine Page – Interiors as Eve**; Angela Lansbury – Death on the Nile as Salome Otterbourne; Maggie Smith – Death on the Nile as Miss Bowers; Mona Washbourne – Stevie as Aunt
**Best Screenplay**: **Julia – Alvin Sargent**; Close Encounters of the Third Kind – Steven Spielberg; The Goodbye Girl – Neil Simon; A Wedding – John Considine, Patricia Resnick, Allan F. Nicholls and Robert Altman	**Best Cinematography**: **Julia – Douglas Slocombe**; Close Encounters of the Third Kind – Vilmos Zsigmond; The Duellists – Frank Tidy; Superman – Geoffrey Unsworth
**Best Costume Design**: **Death on the Nile – Anthony Powell**; The Duellists – Tom Rand; Julia – Anthea Sylbert, Joan Bridge and Annalisa Nasalli Rocca; Star Wars – John Mollo	**Best Editing**: **Midnight Express – Gerry Hambling**; Close Encounters of the Third Kind – Michael Kahn; Julia – Walter Murch; Star Wars – Paul Hirsch, Marcia Lucas and Richard Chew
**Best Original Music**: **Star Wars – John Williams**; Close Encounters of the Third Kind – John Williams; Julia – Georges Delerue; Saturday Night Fever – Bee Gees	**Best Production Design**: **Close Encounters of the Third Kind – Joe Alves**; Julia – Gene Callahan, Willy Holt and Carmen Dillon; Star Wars – John Barry; Superman – John Barry
**Most Promising Newcomer to Leading Film Roles**: **Christopher Reeve – Superman as Superman**; Brad Davis – Midnight Express as Billy Hayes; Mary Beth Hurt – Interiors as Joey; Melanie Mayron – Girlfriends as Susan Weinblatt	**Best Documentary**: **The Silent Witness – David Rolfe**; No other nominees
**Best Short Factual Film**: **Hokusai: An Animated Sketchbook – Tony White**; I'll Find a Way – Beverly Shaffer; Planet Water – Derek Williams; Sunday Muddy Sunday – Lindsay Dale	**Best Specialised Film**: **Twenty Times More Likely – Robert Young**; How a Man Schall Be Armyd – Anthony Wilkinson; Leonard Lewis – Safety Net; Play Safe – David Eady
**Best Sound**: **Star Wars – Sam Shaw, Robert Rutledge, Gordon Davidson, Gene Corso, Derek Ball, Don MacDougall, Bob Minkler, Ray West, Michael Minkler, Les Fresholtz, Richard Portman and Ben Burtt**; Close Encounters of the Third Kind – Gene Cantamessa, Robert Knudson, Don MacDougall, Robert Glass, Steve Katz, Frank Warner, Richard Oswald, David Horton, Sam Gemette, Gary Gerlich, Chet Slomka and Neil Burrow; Saturday Night Fever – Michael Colgan, Les Lazarowitz, John Wilkinson, Robert W. Glass Jr. and John T. Reitz; Superman – Chris Greenham, Gordon McCallum, Peter Pennell, Mike Hopkins, Pat Foster, Stan Fiferman, John Foster, Roy Charman, Norman Bolland, Brian Marshall, Charles Schmitz, Dick Ragusa and Chris Large

== Statistics ==
Films that received multiple nominations
Nominations	Film
10	Julia
9	Close Encounters of the Third Kind
6	Midnight Express
6	Star Wars
5	Superman
4	Death on the Nile
3	The Goodbye Girl
2	The Duellists
2	Interiors
2	Saturday Night Fever
2	A Wedding

Films that received multiple awards
Awards	Film
4	Julia
3	Midnight Express
2	Star Wars

== See also ==
- 51st Academy Awards
- 4th César Awards
- 31st Directors Guild of America Awards
- 36th Golden Globe Awards
- 5th Saturn Awards
- 31st Writers Guild of America Awards
