= Robert Rutledge =

American sound editor (1948–2001)

- Born: June 3, 1948; Los Angeles, California, US
- Died: October 15, 2001 (aged 53); North Hollywood, California, US
- Other names: Robert R. Rutledge; Bob Rutledge
- Occupation: Sound editor
- Years active: 1975–2001

Robert Rutledge (June 3, 1948 – October 15, 2001) was an American sound editor who won Best Sound Editing at the 1986 Academy Awards. He won for Back to the Future, which was shared with Charles L. Campbell.

At the 32nd British Academy Film Awards, he won a BAFTA Award for Best Soundtrack for the film Star Wars. His win was shared with Sam Shaw, Gordon Davidson, Gene Corso, Derek Ball, Don MacDougall, Bob Minkler, Ray West, Michael Minkler, Les Fresholtz, Richard Portman and Ben Burtt.

He also did the sound on the TV show Miami Vice.

== Selected filmography ==
- Breakdown (1997)
- Extreme Justice (1993)
- Out for Justice (1991)
- Jetsons: The Movie (1990)
- Tango & Cash (1989)
- Masters of the Universe (1987)
- Poltergeist II: The Other Side (1986)
- Back to the Future (1985)
- Cat's Eye (1985)
- Police Academy (1984)
- Spacehunter: Adventures in the Forbidden Zone (1983)
- History of the World: Part I (1981)
- Wolfen (1981)
- The Empire Strikes Back (1980)
- Scavenger Hunt (1979)
- Yogi's Space Race (1979)
- Star Wars (1977)
- One Flew Over the Cuckoo's Nest (1975)
