= Gene Corso =

American sound editor

- Born: March 29, 1932; California, U.S.
- Died: May 23, 1996 (aged 64); Los Angeles, California, U.S.
- Occupation: Sound editor

Gene Corso (March 29, 1932 – May 23, 1996) was an American sound editor. He won a British Academy Film Award in the category Best Soundtrack for the film Star Wars.

In addition to his British Academy Film Award win, he was nominated for two Primetime Emmy Awards in the category Outstanding Sound Editing for his work on the television program Airwolf.

== Selected filmography ==
- Star Wars (1977; co-won with Sam Shaw, Robert Rutledge, Gordon Davidson, Derek Ball, Don MacDougall, Bob Minkler, Ray West, Michael Minkler, Les Fresholtz, Richard Portman and Ben Burtt)
