= Gordon Davidson (sound editor) =

American sound editor

- Born: August 4, 1946
- Died: February 18, 1998 (aged 51)
- Occupation: Sound editor

Gordon Davidson (August 4, 1946 – February 18, 1998) was an American sound editor. He won a British Academy Film Award in the category Best Soundtrack for the film Star Wars.

== Selected filmography ==
- Star Wars (1977; co-won with Sam Shaw, Robert Rutledge, Gene Corso, Derek Ball, Don MacDougall, Bob Minkler, Ray West, Michael Minkler, Les Fresholtz, Richard Portman and Ben Burtt)
