= Sam Shaw (sound editor) =

American sound editor (1946–2024)

- Born: Sam Fusco Shaw; June 13, 1946; California, U.S.
- Died: October 6, 2024 (aged 78); Charleston, South Carolina, U.S.
- Occupation: Sound editor
- Parent: Frank X. Shaw (grandfather)

Sam Fusco Shaw (June 13, 1946 – October 6, 2024) was an American sound editor. He won a British Academy Film Award in the category Best Soundtrack for the film Star Wars.

In addition to his British Academy Film Award win, he won a Primetime Emmy Award and was nominated for three more in the category Outstanding Sound Editing for his work on the television programs Marco Polo, Tales of the Gold Monkey, Knight Rider and Airwolf.

Shaw died on October 6, 2024, in Charleston, South Carolina, at the age of 78.

== Selected filmography ==
- Star Wars (1977; co-won with Robert Rutledge, Gordon Davidson, Gene Corso, Derek Ball, Don MacDougall, Bob Minkler, Ray West, Michael Minkler, Les Fresholtz, Richard Portman and Ben Burtt)
