= Star Wars (film) =

1977 film by George Lucas

- Theatrical release poster by Tom Jung
- Directed by: George Lucas
- Written by: George Lucas
- Produced by: Gary Kurtz
- Starring: Mark Hamill; Harrison Ford; Carrie Fisher; Peter Cushing; Alec Guinness
- Cinematography: Gilbert Taylor
- Edited by: Paul Hirsch; Marcia Lucas; Richard Chew
- Music by: John Williams
- Production company: Lucasfilm Ltd.
- Distributed by: Twentieth Century-Fox
- Release date: May 25, 1977
- Running time: 121 minutes
- Country: United States
- Language: English
- Budget: $11 million
- Box office: $775.4 million

Star Wars (later retitled Star Wars: Episode IV – A New Hope) is a 1977 American epic space opera film written and directed by George Lucas. Produced by Lucasfilm Ltd. and distributed by Twentieth Century-Fox, it is the first film in the Star Wars franchise and the fourth chronological chapter of the "Skywalker Saga". Set in a fictional galaxy ruled by the tyrannical Galactic Empire, the film follows a resistance movement called the Rebel Alliance that aims to destroy the Empire's ultimate weapon, the Death Star. When the rebel leader Princess Leia is captured by the Galactic Empire, Luke Skywalker acquires stolen architectural plans for the Death Star and sets out to rescue her while learning the ways of a metaphysical power known as "the Force" from the Jedi Master Obi-Wan Kenobi. The film stars Mark Hamill, Harrison Ford, Carrie Fisher, Peter Cushing, Alec Guinness, Anthony Daniels, Kenny Baker, Peter Mayhew, David Prowse, and James Earl Jones.

Lucas had the idea for a science fiction film in the vein of Flash Gordon around the time he completed his first film, THX 1138 (1971), and began working on a treatment after completing American Graffiti (1973). After numerous rewrites, principal photography began in March 1976 in locations including Tunisia and Elstree Studios in Hertfordshire, England. Lucas formed the visual effects company Industrial Light & Magic to help create the film's visual effects. Star Wars suffered production difficulties: the cast and crew believed the film would be a failure, and it went $3 million over budget due to delays.

Few were confident in the film's box office prospects. It was released in a small number of theaters in the United States on May 25, 1977, and quickly became a surprise blockbuster, leading to it being expanded to a much wider release. Star Wars opened to critical acclaim, with particular praise for its special effects. It grossed $410 million worldwide during its initial run, surpassing Jaws (1975) to become the highest-grossing film until the release of E.T. the Extra-Terrestrial (1982); subsequent releases have brought its total gross to $775 million. When adjusted for inflation, Star Wars is the second-highest-grossing film in the United States and Canada (behind Gone with the Wind) and the fourth-highest-grossing film of all time. It received six Academy Awards, two BAFTA Awards, and thirteen Saturn Awards, among others. The film has been reissued many times with Lucas' support, including the 1981 reissue giving the film the subtitle Episode IV – A New Hope, and the 1997 "Special Edition". The reissues have contained many changes, including new scenes, visual effects, and dialogue.

Often regarded as one of the greatest and most influential films of all time, Star Wars quickly became a worldwide pop culture phenomenon, launching an industry of tie-in products, including novels, comics, video games, amusement park attractions and merchandise such as toys, games, and clothing. It became one of the first 25 films selected by the United States Library of Congress for preservation in the National Film Registry in 1989, and its soundtrack was added to the U.S. National Recording Registry in 2004. The Empire Strikes Back (1980) and Return of the Jedi (1983) followed Star Wars, rounding out the original Star Wars trilogy. A prequel trilogy and a sequel trilogy have since been released, in addition to various spin-off films and television series.

== Plot ==
In a period of galactic civil war, Rebel Alliance spies have stolen blueprints to the Death Star, a colossal space station built by the Galactic Empire that is capable of destroying entire planets. Princess Leia Organa of Alderaan, secretly a rebel leader, has obtained the schematics, but her ship is intercepted and boarded by Imperial forces under the command of Darth Vader. Leia is taken prisoner, but the droids R2-D2 and C-3PO escape with the plans, crash-landing on the nearby desert planet of Tatooine. Darth Vader orders his troops to pursue the droids.

The droids are captured by Jawa traders, who sell them to the moisture farmers Owen and Beru Lars and their nephew, Luke Skywalker. While Luke is cleaning R2-D2, he discovers a recording of Leia requesting help from a former ally named Obi-Wan Kenobi. R2-D2 goes missing, and while searching for him, Luke is attacked by Sand People. He is rescued by the elderly hermit Ben Kenobi, who soon reveals himself as Obi-Wan. He tells Luke about his past as one of the Jedi Knights, peacekeepers of the former Galactic Republic, who drew mystical abilities from the Force, an energy field that connects all living beings. He explains that the Jedi were all but exterminated by the Empire. Luke learns that his father, also a Jedi, fought alongside Obi-Wan during the Clone Wars until Vader, Obi-Wan's former pupil, turned to the dark side of the Force and murdered him. Obi-Wan gives Luke his father's lightsaber, the signature weapon of the Jedi.

R2-D2 plays Leia's full message, in which she begs Obi-Wan to take the Death Star plans to Alderaan and give them to her father, a fellow veteran, for analysis. Luke initially declines Obi-Wan's offer to accompany him to Alderaan and learn the ways of the Force. However, he quickly changes his mind after Imperial stormtroopers murder his family and destroy his home while searching for the droids. Seeking a way off the planet, Luke and Obi-Wan travel with the droids to the city of Mos Eisley and hire the smuggler Han Solo and his Wookiee partner Chewbacca, pilots of the starship Millennium Falcon.

On the way to Alderaan, Obi-Wan begins Luke's training in the use of the Force. Meanwhile, the Death Star, under the command of Grand Moff Tarkin, obliterates Alderaan with its giant laser. It then captures the Falcon with a tractor beam, but Luke and his companions manage to avoid detection and infiltrate the station. Vader, however, senses Obi-Wan's presence, and begins searching for him. As Obi-Wan deactivates the tractor beam, Luke persuades Han and Chewbacca to help him rescue Leia, who is scheduled for execution after refusing to reveal the location of the rebel base. After disabling the tractor beam, Obi-Wan is killed by Darth Vader in a lightsaber duel, which allows the rest of the group to escape. Using a tracking device placed on the Falcon, the Empire locates the rebel base on the moon Yavin 4.

Analysis of the Death Star schematics reveals a weakness in a small exhaust port leading directly to the station's reactor. Luke joins the Rebellion's X-wing squadron in a desperate attack against the Death Star, while Han and Chewbacca leave to pay off a debt to the crime lord Jabba the Hutt. In the ensuing battle, Vader leads a squadron of TIE fighters and destroys several rebel ships, while Tarkin prepares to destroy Yavin 4 with the Death Star. Han and Chewbacca unexpectedly return in the Falcon, knocking Vader's ship off course before he can shoot Luke down. Guided by the voice of Obi-Wan's spirit, Luke uses the Force to aim his torpedoes into the exhaust port, causing the Death Star to explode moments before it can fire on the rebel base. In a triumphant ceremony, Leia awards Luke and Han medals for their heroism.

== Cast ==
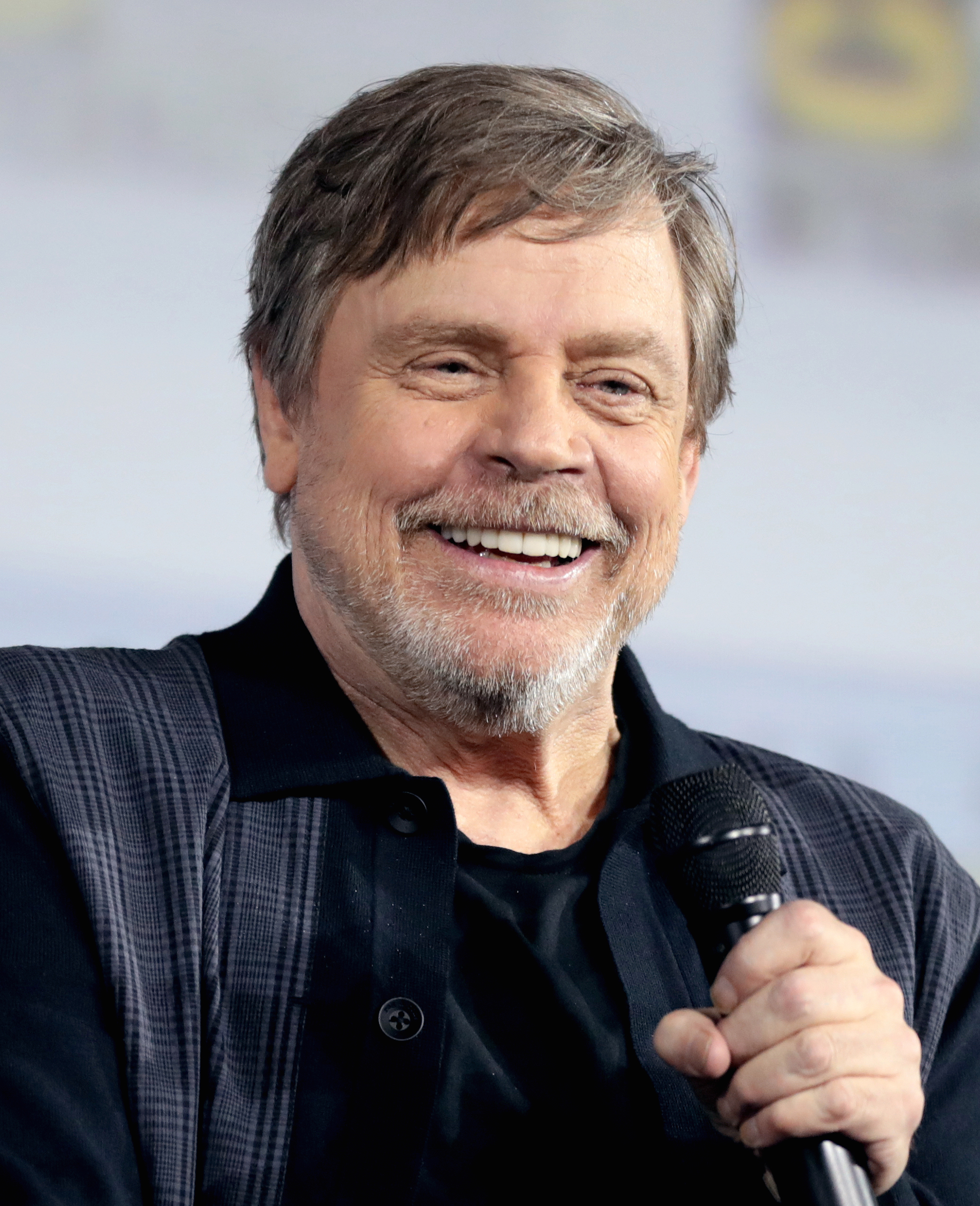
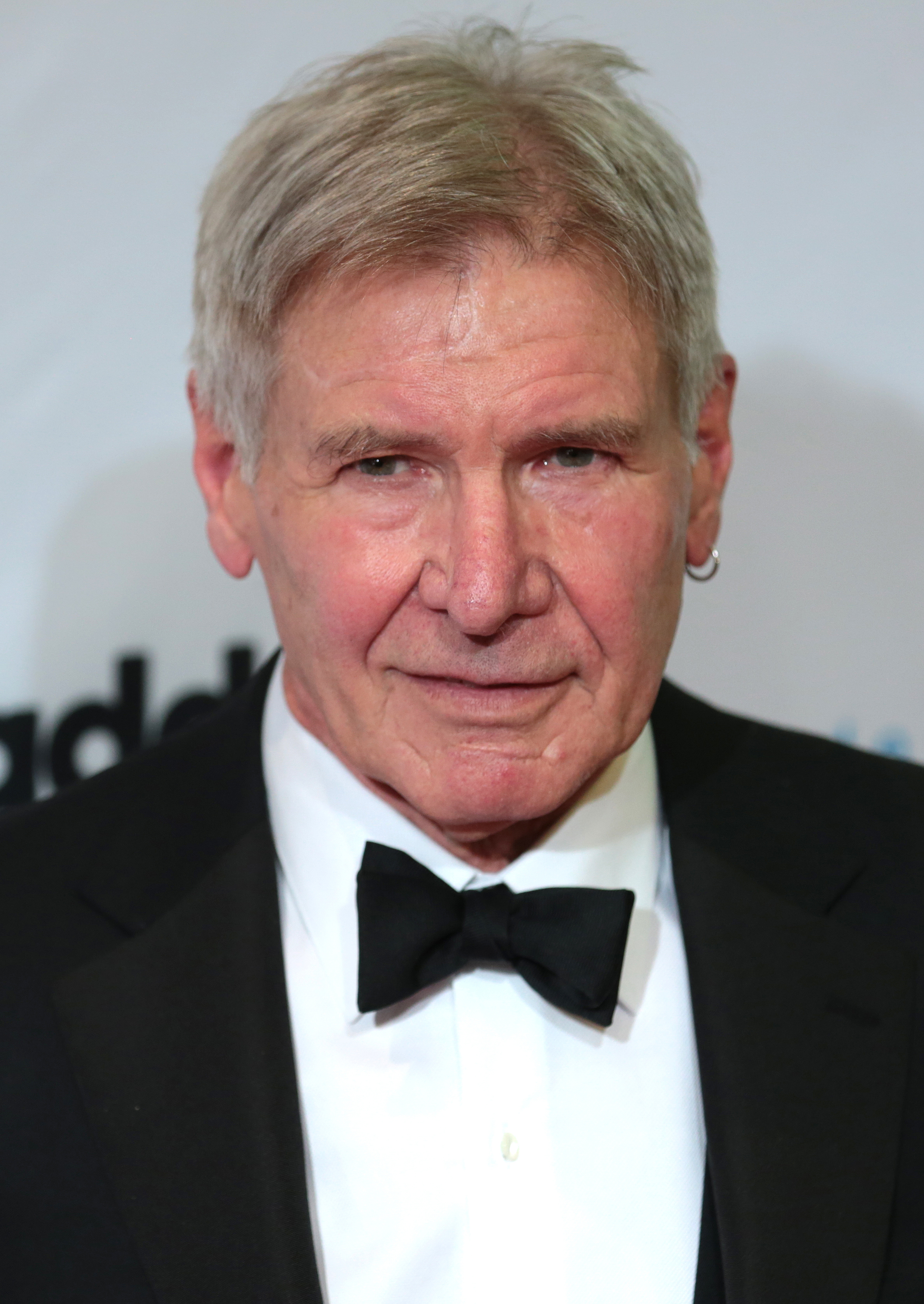
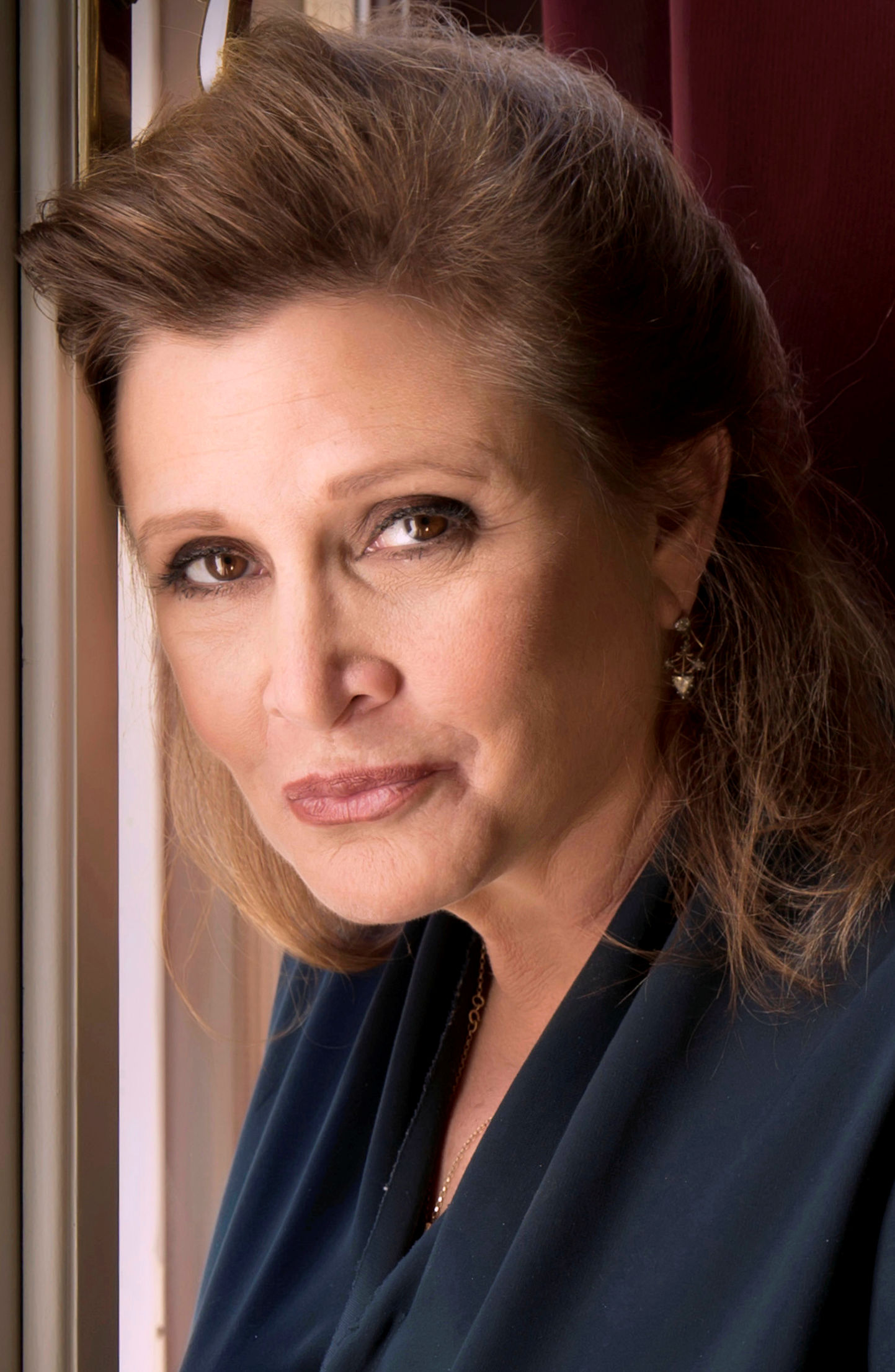
Left to right: Mark Hamill (pictured in 2019), Harrison Ford (2017), and Carrie Fisher (2013)
- Mark Hamill as Luke Skywalker: A young adult raised by his aunt and uncle on Tatooine, who dreams of something more than his current life
- Harrison Ford as Han Solo: A smuggler and captain of the Millennium Falcon
- Carrie Fisher as Princess Leia Organa: Princess of the planet Alderaan, member of the Imperial Senate, and a leader of the Rebel Alliance
- Peter Cushing as Grand Moff Tarkin: The commander of the Death Star
- Alec Guinness as Obi-Wan "Ben" Kenobi: An aging Jedi Master who introduces Luke to the Force
- Anthony Daniels as See Threepio (C3PO): A humanoid protocol droid (Note: The character's name is spelled "C3PO" in the credits of Star Wars, but is spelled "C-3PO" in later films.)
- Kenny Baker as Artoo Detoo (R2-D2): An astromech droid
- Peter Mayhew as Chewbacca: Han's Wookiee friend and co-pilot of the Millennium Falcon
- David Prowse / James Earl Jones (voice; uncredited) as Lord Darth Vader: Obi-Wan's former Jedi apprentice who fell to the dark side of the Force

Phil Brown and Shelagh Fraser appear as Luke's Uncle Owen and Aunt Beru, respectively, and Jack Purvis portrays the Chief Jawa. Rebel leaders include Alex McCrindle as General Dodonna and Eddie Byrne as General Willard. Imperial commanders include Don Henderson as General Taggi, (Note: The character is referred to as "General Cassio Tagge" in later Star Wars media.) Richard LeParmentier as Admiral Motti, and Leslie Schofield as Commander #1. Rebel pilots are played by Drewe Henley (Red Leader, mistakenly credited as Drewe Hemley), Denis Lawson (Red Two/Wedge, credited as Dennis Lawson), Garrick Hagon (Red Three/Biggs), Jack Klaff (Red Four/John "D"), William Hootkins (Red Six/Porkins), Angus MacInnes (Gold Leader, credited as Angus McInnis), Jeremy Sinden (Gold Two), and Graham Ashley (Gold Five). Uncredited actors include Paul Blake and Maria De Aragon as the bounty hunter Greedo, Alfie Curtis as the outlaw who confronts Luke in the cantina, (Note: The character is referred to as "Dr. Evazan" in later Star Wars media) Shane Rimmer as a rebel technician on Yavin IV, and Peter Geddis as the rebel officer who is strangled by Darth Vader. (Note: The character is referred to as "Captain Raymus Antilles" in later Star Wars media.) Modified archival audio recordings of John Wayne were used for the voice of Garindan, an Imperial spy.

== Production ==
=== Development ===
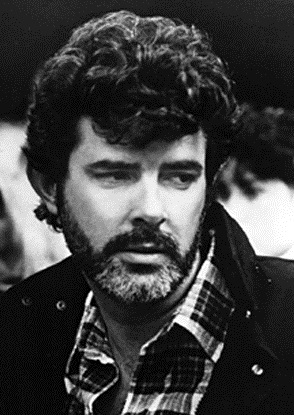
Star Wars creator George Lucas (pictured in 1986)

George Lucas had been fascinated by the Flash Gordon serials (1936–40) since he was young, and prior to directing his first feature film, THX 1138 (1971), he considered developing a science fiction film with a similar escapist adventure tone. A conversation between Lucas and producer Gary Kurtz, during which both men discussed their dissatisfaction with the prevailing trend toward dystopian and horror-focused science fiction films, set Lucas' project in motion. Lucas met with King Features in early 1971 about acquiring Flash Gordon's film rights, but the company was then pursuing Federico Fellini to direct a film version. Lucas became motivated to write an original space opera screenplay, inspired by Flash Gordon as well as earlier science fiction works such as Edgar Rice Burroughs's Barsoom series (1912–43) and Edwin Arnold's Lieut. Gullivar Jones: His Vacation (1905). Lucas later said that his goal was "to give young people an honest, wholesome fantasy life" which offered "the romance, the adventure, and the fun" that he found in older genre films.

In May 1971, Lucas pitched two film projects—American Graffiti (1973) and the space opera—to United Artists president David Picker. In August, the studio registered "The Star Wars" as a trademark with the Motion Picture Association of America. United Artists ultimately passed on Graffiti after reviewing Lucas's draft script. The film was then taken up by Ned Tanen at Universal Pictures, and Lucas directed it in 1972. Its release was uncertain after Tanen reacted poorly to a preview screening in January 1973. Since Lucas's next intended project, Apocalypse Now (1979), was stalled in development hell at Columbia Pictures, he began writing the space opera full-time in January 1973.

Lucas began by inventing exotic names for characters and places to develop the universe's atmosphere. Several of these names, though ultimately unused in the film, made it into later sequels. He compiled an unfinished two-page synopsis titled Journal of the Whills, which chronicled the tale of CJ Thorpe, apprentice to the legendary "Jedi-Bendu" Mace Windy. Lucas's agent Jeff Berg was confused by the plot and recommended he write something simpler. Lucas's second draft, a 10-page treatment titled The Star Wars, was completed in early May 1973. This treatment borrowed narrative beats from Akira Kurosawa's 1958 film The Hidden Fortress, (Note: Lucas and Kurtz previously considered producing a remake of The Hidden Fortress, following the success of The Magnificent Seven (1960), which was based on Kurosawa's film Seven Samurai (1954).) and follows an elderly general, Luke Skywalker, who escorts a rebel princess to the planet Ophuchi while being pursued by Imperial troops.

Lucas approached United Artists with the new treatment in summer 1973, but Picker rejected the project out of hand, and released the trademark for "The Star Wars" a few months later. Universal Pictures, which held contractual first rights after United Artists, effectively rejected The Star Wars by allowing the ten-day contractual response period to expire; in 2002, Kurtz claimed that Universal head Lew Wasserman was uninterested in science fiction. Lucas's colleague Francis Ford Coppola brought the project to the Directors Company, a production company he ran with Peter Bogdanovich and William Friedkin in association with Paramount Pictures, but Friedkin rejected it as he "couldn't believe George could pull it off". Walt Disney Productions also turned down the project.

Ten days after Universal's rejection, Lucas pitched The Star Wars to Alan Ladd Jr., vice president of creative affairs at Twentieth Century Fox. Ladd was enthused by a private screening of American Graffiti and believed in Lucas' talent. (Note: Some accounts characterise Ladd as being confused by Lucas's vision but taking a chance on the project because of Lucas's passion. Ladd stated in a 2008 interview: "[Lucas] was going on about faraway galaxies and sand people and special effects, and frankly I didn’t have a clue what in the world he was talking about." However, Ladd stated in 2014 that he "understood [Lucas's pitch] completely", noting that Lucas explained the project "in terms of other films" such as the Errol Flynn adventure films Captain Blood (1935) and The Sea Hawk (1940).) He organised a deal memo, dated July 13, 1973, which gave Lucas $150,000 (equivalent to $1,100,000 in 2025) to write and direct The Star Wars, and gave Lucas's production company Lucasfilm a budget of $3.5 million and 40% of the film's profits. In August 1973, American Graffiti was released to major commercial success, which afforded Lucas the leverage to gain control of merchandising and sequel rights in his deal with Twentieth Century Fox.

=== Writing ===
It's the flotsam and jetsam from the period when I was twelve years old. All the books and films and comics that I liked when I was a child. The plot is simple—good against evil—and the film is designed to be all the fun things and fantasy things I remember. The word for this movie is fun.

— George Lucas, 1977

Lucas began revising his treatment into a script around September 1973. He wrote four major drafts of the screenplay in his search "for just the right ingredients, characters and storyline". By May 1974, he had expanded the original treatment into a first draft, which established the Jedi-Bendu (later shortened to Jedi) as a moribund group of galactic guardians who had been decimated by their sinister enemies, the Sith. Lucas changed the protagonist to an 18-year-old, Annikin Starkiller, and reduced the elderly general Skywalker to the supporting role of Starkiller's mentor. The captured princess was named Leia, and the heroes are assisted by the green-skinned alien Han Solo. This draft also introduced Darth Vader, a general to the Imperial commander Valorum; the latter character is a Sith who switches sides to help the heroes. Additional characters such as the Wookiee Chewbacca and the bickering droids R2-D2 and C-3PO emerged in this draft. The narrative's similarities to The Hidden Fortress were reduced as Lucas explored contemporary science fiction magazines and comic books for potential inspiration.

Lucas found writing agonizing and faced further difficulty on his second draft. He forced himself to sit at his desk eight hours per day, writing five pages per day by hand until finishing a new draft. He developed stomach pains and would cut off clumps of his hair with a pair of scissors when facing writer's block. Lucas's second draft, Adventures of the Starkiller, Episode One: The Star Wars, was completed in January 1975. This draft begins with the two droids escaping Imperial forces before introducing the new protagonist, renamed from Annikin to Luke Starkiller, who lives in the desert (Note: Lucas at one point envisioned this planet (known as Utapau in the second draft and Tatooine in the final film) as a jungle planet. Kurtz traveled to the Philippines to scout locations. However, the thought of spending months filming in the jungle made Lucas uncomfortable so he made it a desert planet instead.) with his uncle Owen and several younger brothers. Lucas removed the protagonist's mentor figure and Princess Leia from this draft. Lucas changed Han Solo to a humanoid character "like Bogart". Chewbacca became Han's co-pilot; this decision was inspired by Lucas's Alaskan Malamute dog, Indiana, who often sat in the passenger seat of his car while he was driving. The structure of the story's villains was also heavily changed. Lucas removed the Emperor and introduced Governor Hoedaack (later renamed Tarkin). Lucas also transferred many of Valorum's characteristics into Vader, making him a Sith lord. This draft introduced a metaphysical energy field called "The Force of Others", made up of the good "Ashla" and the bad "Bogan", and involved Luke protecting a powerful Kyber Crystal which can enhance a Jedi's Force powers. The script ends with a text crawl promising the next story in the series. Lucas's friends responded to this draft with less enthusiasm than the first. Coppola felt that Lucas had unnecessarily "chucked the [first] script and started again". Shortly after the second draft's completion, Lucas briefly toyed with making the film's protagonist a young heroine.

As early as 2002, Lucas has stated that the extreme length of the second draft led him to split the story across the three films of the original trilogy, using this draft's first act as the basis of the first film. (Note: Attributed to multiple references:) However, this claim has been challenged by Kurtz and by researchers Michael Kaminski and Chris Taylor, who have compared Lucas's drafts with the released trilogy. Lucas stated in 2010 that he "didn't know where [the narrative] was going" when the film first released: "The trick is to pretend you've planned the whole thing out in advance."

In February 1975, Twentieth Century Fox granted the film a budget of $5 million (equivalent to $30 million in 2025), which was later increased to $8.25 million (equivalent to $49 million). Lucas started writing with a budget in mind, and—with Fox having just shut down its special effects department—reduced the number of complex special effects sequences. In May 1975, he wrote a six-page synopsis for Fox executives, which again changed story details. Leia was reintroduced as the rebellion's leader, and the mentor character was also reintroduced, now a hermit and former general named Ben Kenobi (Obi-Wan "Ben" Kenobi in the final film). Lucas's third draft was completed on August 1, 1975, titled The Star Wars From the Adventures of Luke Starkiller. This version contains most elements of the final film, and takes on a fairy tale quality with more humor and banter between the characters. Vader is now established as the lead villain, with his backstory as Obi-Wan's former apprentice who is said to have killed Luke's father also introduced.

For the fourth draft, Lucas' friends Gloria Katz and Willard Huyck helped revise the dialogue to make it wittier, particularly Han Solo's lines. Lucas also simplified "The Force of Others" to "the Force" and removed the Kyber Crystal, making the concept more abstract overall. This fourth and final draft was dated January 1, 1976, and titled The Adventures of Luke Starkiller as taken from the Journal of the Whills, Saga I: The Star Wars. During production, Lucas changed Luke's surname from Starkiller to Skywalker, (Note: The change to Luke's name came so late in production that Leia's rescue from her prison cell had to be reshot. It is the first time Luke states his full name in the script ("I'm Luke Skywalker, I'm here to rescue you").) and changed the title back to The Star Wars, and then, finally, to Star Wars. The film's opening crawl was originally six paragraphs of four sentences each, and gave more detail about the universe and its lore. Filmmaker Brian De Palma, who watched an unfinished cut of the film in early 1977, criticized the crawl for being too long and incomprehensible. De Palma and Jay Cocks helped Lucas edit the crawl down to four sentences.

=== Design ===
Ralph McQuarrie's first Star Wars concept painting, completed in January 1975, inspired Anthony Daniels to audition for the role of C-3PO. McQuarrie's output is credited for establishing the film's aesthetic.

The ambition of Lucas's vision made it difficult to establish a budget for the film. In November 1974, he commissioned the artist Ralph McQuarrie to illustrate scenes from the film, providing Kurtz with a visual reference to help estimate cost. McQuarrie's first Star Wars painting, submitted the day after Lucas completed his second draft script, depicted C-3PO and R2-D2 lost on a desert planet. McQuarrie also depicted a scene from the second draft where Vader briefly wears a breathing mask while exposed to the vacuum of space; Lucas was enthused by the image, and by the fourth draft, Vader wore his mask throughout the entirety of the film. Lucas also recruited Colin Cantwell (Note: Cantwell was hired shortly before McQuarrie.) to visualize the initial spacecraft models and Alex Tavoularis to draw storyboards of the film's opening sequence. These artworks helped studio executives and other collaborators visualize the film. McQuarrie's artwork has been credited for establishing the visual tone of the film as well as subsequent Star Wars media.

The trouble with the future in most futurist movies is that it always looks new and clean and shiny ... What is required for true credibility is a used future.

— George Lucas on the aesthetic of Star Wars

Lucas wanted to create props and sets that had never before been used in science-fiction films. He hired as production designers John Barry and Roger Christian, who were then working on the film Lucky Lady (1975). Christian remembers that Lucas did not want anything in Star Wars to stand out, and wanted everything to look "real and used". In this "used future" aesthetic, all devices, ships, and buildings related to Tatooine and the rebels look aged and dirty, and the rebel ships look cobbled together in contrast to the Empire's sleeker designs. Lucas believed this aesthetic would lend credibility to the film's fictional places, and Christian was enthusiastic about this approach.

Barry and Christian started working with Lucas before Star Wars was funded by Fox. For several months, in a studio in Kensal Rise, England, they planned the creation of props and sets with very little money. According to Christian, the Millennium Falcon set was the most difficult to build. He wanted the interior of the ship to look like a submarine, and used inexpensive airplane scrap metal to achieve the desired effect. Set construction later moved to Elstree Studios, where Barry created thirty sets. All nine sound stages at Elstree were needed to house the planets, starships, caves, control rooms, cantinas, and Death Star corridors. The rebel hangar was so massive it had to be built at nearby Shepperton Studios, which contained Europe's largest sound stage at the time.

=== Casting ===
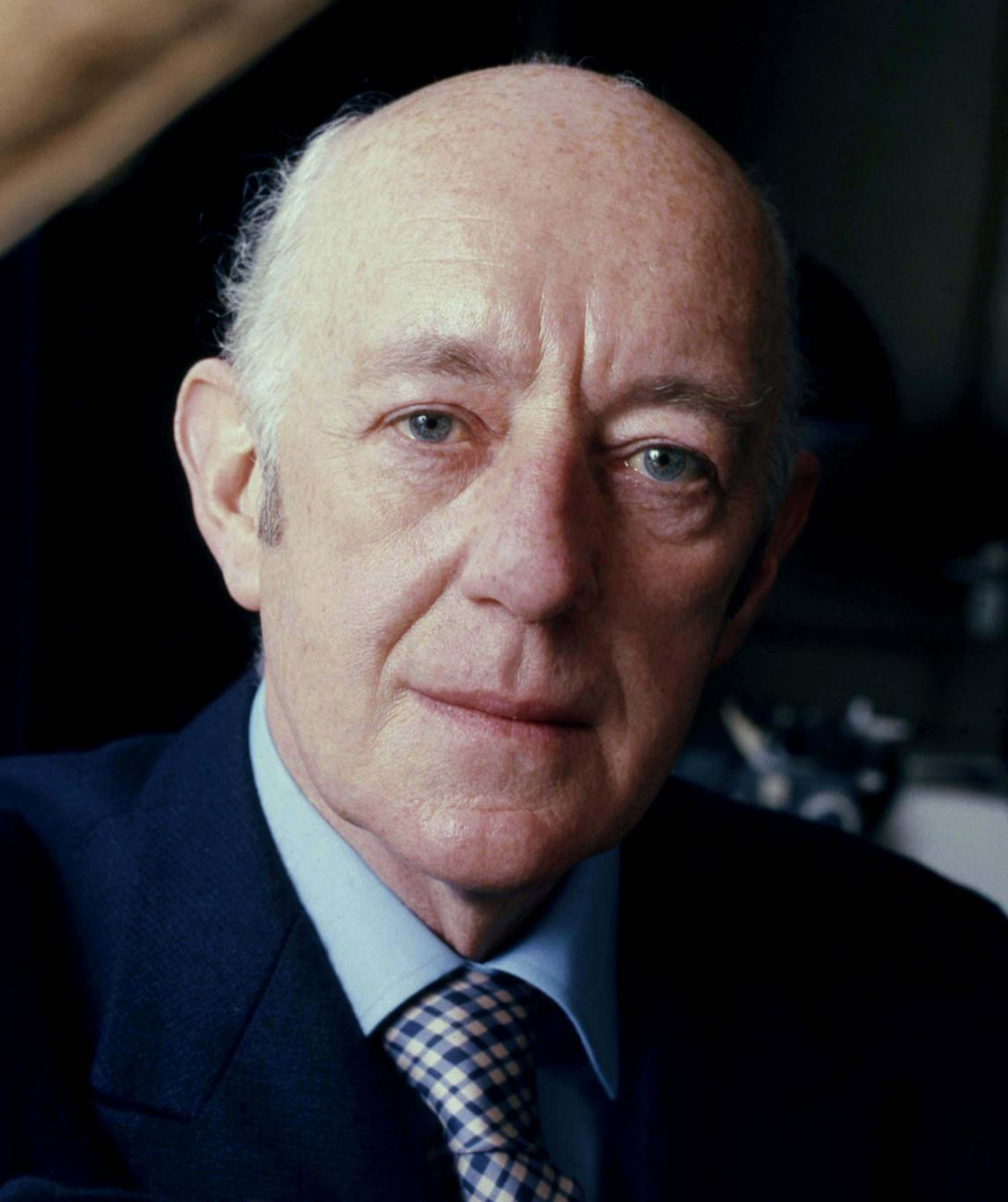
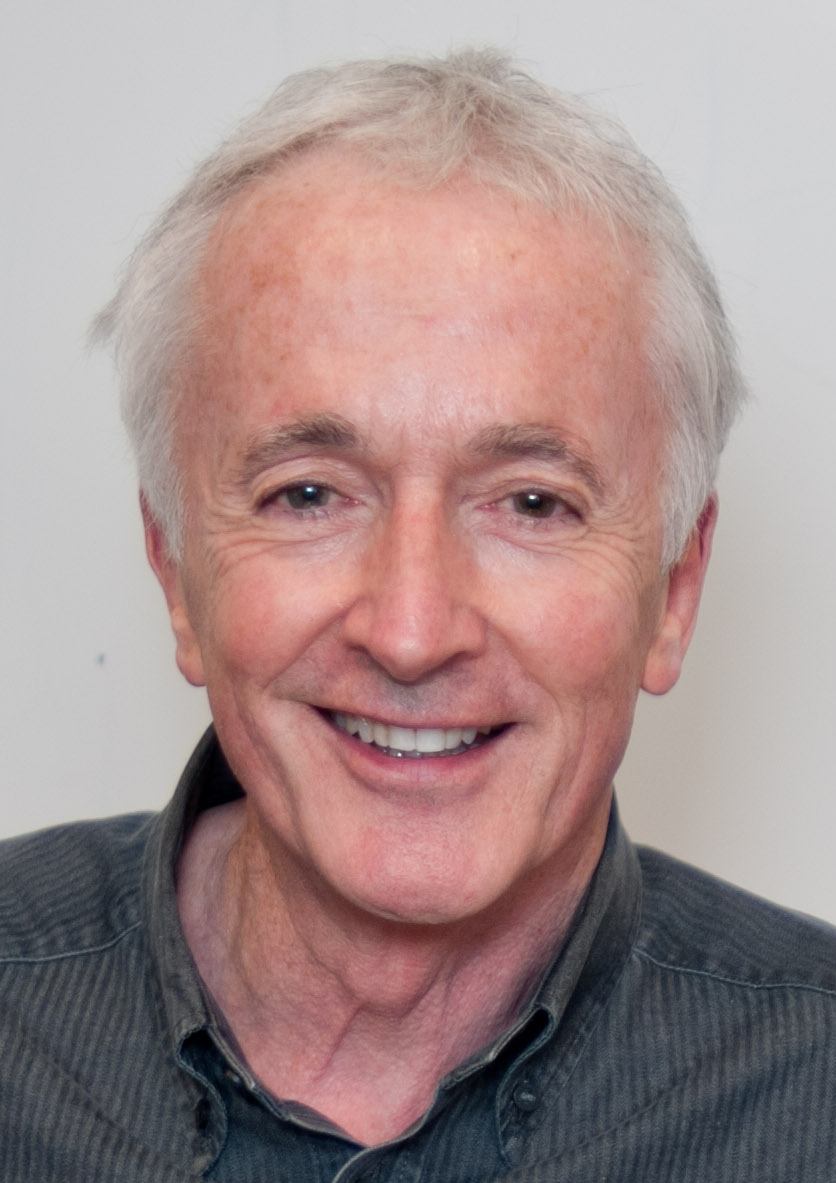
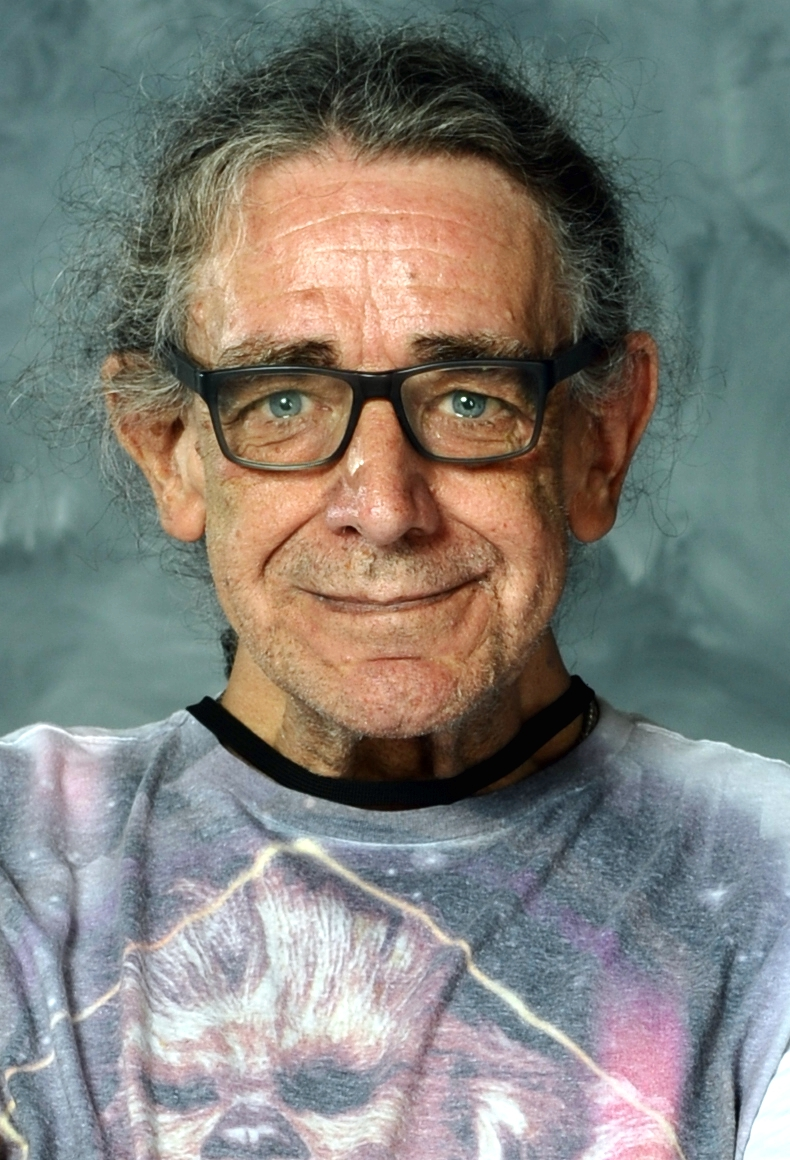
Left to right: Alec Guinness (pictured in 1973), Anthony Daniels (2011), and Peter Mayhew (2015)

Auditions for the three leads of Star Wars took place in December 1975 at the American Zoetrope office in Los Angeles. Lucas wanted to cast mainly unknown actors to maintain the film's fantasy, believing that "it has a tendency to make you believe that these are the real characters". Mark Hamill was cast as Luke Skywalker over Robby Benson, William Katt, Kurt Russell, Will Seltzer and Charles Martin Smith. (Note: Attributed to multiple references:) Actresses who auditioned for Leia included Carrie Fisher, Jodie Foster, Amy Irving, Terri Nunn, Linda Purl, Lisa Eilbacher, Anne-Marie Martin, and Cindy Williams. Foster stated she was offered the role but turned it down because she was under contract with Disney. Koo Stark was allegedly considered for Leia, but was instead cast as Luke's friend Camie Marstrap, a character that was eventually cut from the film. Although Lucas favoured Nunn, Fisher was ultimately cast on the recommendation of her friend Fred Roos, who worked uncredited on the film as a casting consultant.

Actors who auditioned for Han Solo include Perry King (who later played Han in the 1981 radio series), Kurt Russell, Sylvester Stallone, and Christopher Walken; additionally, Richard Dreyfuss and Nick Nolte met with Lucas to discuss the role. (Note: James Caan, Burt Reynolds, and Al Pacino have all said that they turned down the part of Han Solo.) Lucas briefly considered casting a Black actor as Han Solo, with Glynn Turman auditioning for the role and Yaphet Kotto also under consideration. Lucas initially resisted auditioning Harrison Ford because he did not want actors from American Graffiti to distract audiences. Ford, then a carpenter, was hired by Roos to repair a door at the American Zoetrope office. When Lucas and Ford crossed paths, Roos convinced Lucas to let Ford read for Han during auditions for Luke and Leia. Lucas was eventually won over by Ford and cast him as Han.

Twentieth Century Fox pushed for at least one established star in the cast. Kurtz felt a strong character actor was required to convey the "stability and gravitas" of Obi-Wan. Lucas considered Peter Cushing for the role, but decided the actor's lean features would be better suited for Tarkin. He also considered Japanese actor Toshiro Mifune, known for starring in many of Kurosawa's films. In 2015, Mifune's daughter stated her father turned down the roles of Obi-Wan and Vader over concerns that poor special effects would cheapen the image of samurai. English actor Alec Guinness was surprised by the offer to play Obi-Wan and disliked the script's "ropey" dialogue, but took the role as he "had to go on turning the page". Ford admired Guinness' preparation, professionalism and kindness towards the other actors, recalling that Guinness had "a very clear head about how to serve the story". On top of his salary, Guinness received 2.25% of the film's backend grosses, which made him wealthy later in life.

Trained mime artist Anthony Daniels sought the role of C-3PO after he saw McQuarrie's first concept painting and was struck by the vulnerability in the droid's face. Daniels was initially cast only for C-3PO's physical performance, as Lucas envisioned the droid speaking like an American "used-car dealer" or "con man" rather than a "fussy British robot butler". Lucas auditioned around thirty American actors during post-production, (Note: According to Daniels, actors who auditioned for C-3PO's voice included Richard Dreyfuss and Mel Blanc.) but admitted that "none of the voices were as good as [Daniels]".

Performer Kenny Baker and hospital porter Peter Mayhew were cast largely due to their height. At 3 feet 8 inches (1.12 m), Baker was offered the role of the diminutive R2-D2 immediately after meeting Lucas. He turned it down multiple times, however, before finally accepting. Mayhew initially auditioned for Vader, but was quickly cast as Chewbacca when Lucas and Kurtz saw his 7-foot-3-inch (2.21 m) stature. Mayhew modeled his performance on the mannerisms of gorillas and bears he observed in public zoos, and performed his lines in English to give Ford something to play against.

Bodybuilder David Prowse was originally offered the role of Chewbacca but turned it down as "people remember villains longer than heroes". He was cast as Darth Vader and assumed his voice would be used in the film, but Lucas felt Prowse's West Country English accent was inappropriate for the character. Roos successfully advocated for James Earl Jones to voice Vader, despite Lucas's concern that the film's only speaking Black actor would be portraying the villain. According to Jones, Lucas had previously considered Orson Welles but felt his voice would be too recognizable. Jones recorded all his lines for the film in a single day. He elected to go uncredited as he considered himself merely "special effects".

=== Filming ===
In 1975, Lucas founded the visual effects company Industrial Light & Magic (ILM) after discovering that Fox's visual effects department had been shut down. ILM began its work on Star Wars in a warehouse in Van Nuys, California. Most of the visual effects used pioneering digital motion control photography developed by John Dykstra and his team, which created the illusion of size by employing small models and slowly moving cameras. The technology is now known as the Dykstraflex system. (Note: Attributed to multiple references:)

Visually, Lucas wanted Star Wars to have the "ethereal quality" of a fairy tale, but also "an alien look". He hoped to achieve "the seeming contradiction of [the] strange graphics of fantasy combined with the feel of a documentary". His first choice for cinematographer was Geoffrey Unsworth, who had worked on 2001: A Space Odyssey. Unsworth initially accepted the job, but eventually withdrew to work on Vincente Minnelli's A Matter of Time (1976). Unsworth was replaced by Gilbert Taylor, who had overseen photography for Dr. Strangelove and A Hard Day's Night (both 1964). Lucas admired Taylor's work on both films, describing them as "eccentrically photographed pictures with a strong documentary flavor".

Once filming was under way, Lucas and Taylor had many disputes. Lucas' lighting suggestions were rejected by Taylor, who believed Lucas was overstepping his boundaries by giving specific instructions, sometimes even moving lights and cameras himself. After Fox executives complained about the soft-focus visual style of the film, Taylor changed his approach, which infuriated Lucas. Kurtz said that Lucas' inability to delegate tasks resulted from his history directing low-budget films, which required him to be involved with all aspects of the production. Taylor claimed that Lucas avoided contact with him, which motivated the cinematographer to make his own decisions about how to shoot the film.

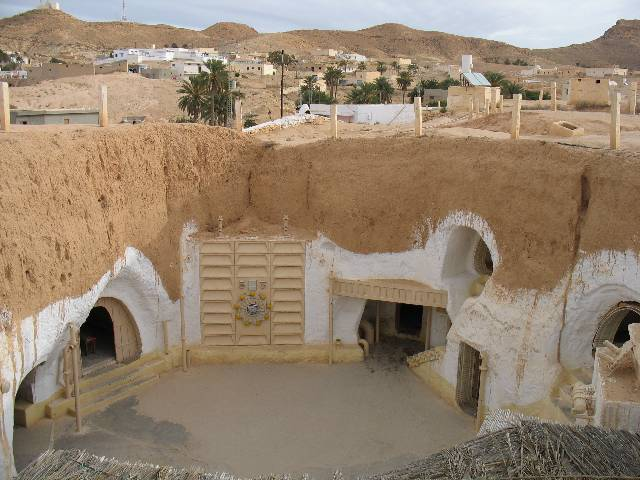
Hotel Sidi Driss, the underground building used as Luke's Tatooine home

Kurtz researched various international desert locales for Tatooine, and ultimately decided on southern Tunisia on the edge of the Sahara. Principal photography began in Chott el Djerid in March 1976. Meanwhile, a construction crew in nearby Tozeur spent eight weeks creating additional Tatooine locations. The scenes of Luke's Tatooine home were filmed at the Hotel Sidi Driss in Matmata. Additional Tatooine scenes were shot at Death Valley in the United States.

The filmmakers experienced many problems in Tunisia. Production fell behind schedule in the first week due to malfunctioning props and electronic breakdowns. (Note: Attributed to multiple references:) The radio-controlled R2-D2 models functioned poorly. The left leg of Daniels' C-3PO costume shattered, injuring his foot. At the end of his first day of filming in March, Daniels was covered in scars and scratches from the costume; this was the first and only time he wore the costume for an entire day. A rare winter rainstorm struck the country, which further disrupted filming. After two and a half weeks in Tunisia, production moved to Elstree Studios in London for interior scenes. (Note: Attributed to multiple references:)

Kurtz has described Lucas as a shy loner who does not enjoy working with a large cast and crew. According to Fisher, he gave very little direction to the actors, and when he did, it usually consisted of the words "faster" and "more intense". British union rules required that filming finish by 5:30 pm, unless Lucas was in the middle of a shot, in which case the crew could vote on whether to continue an extra 15 minutes. Lucas's request to continue was usually voted down. Most of the British crew considered Star Wars a children's film, and the actors sometimes did not take the project seriously. Kenny Baker later confessed that he thought the film would be a failure.

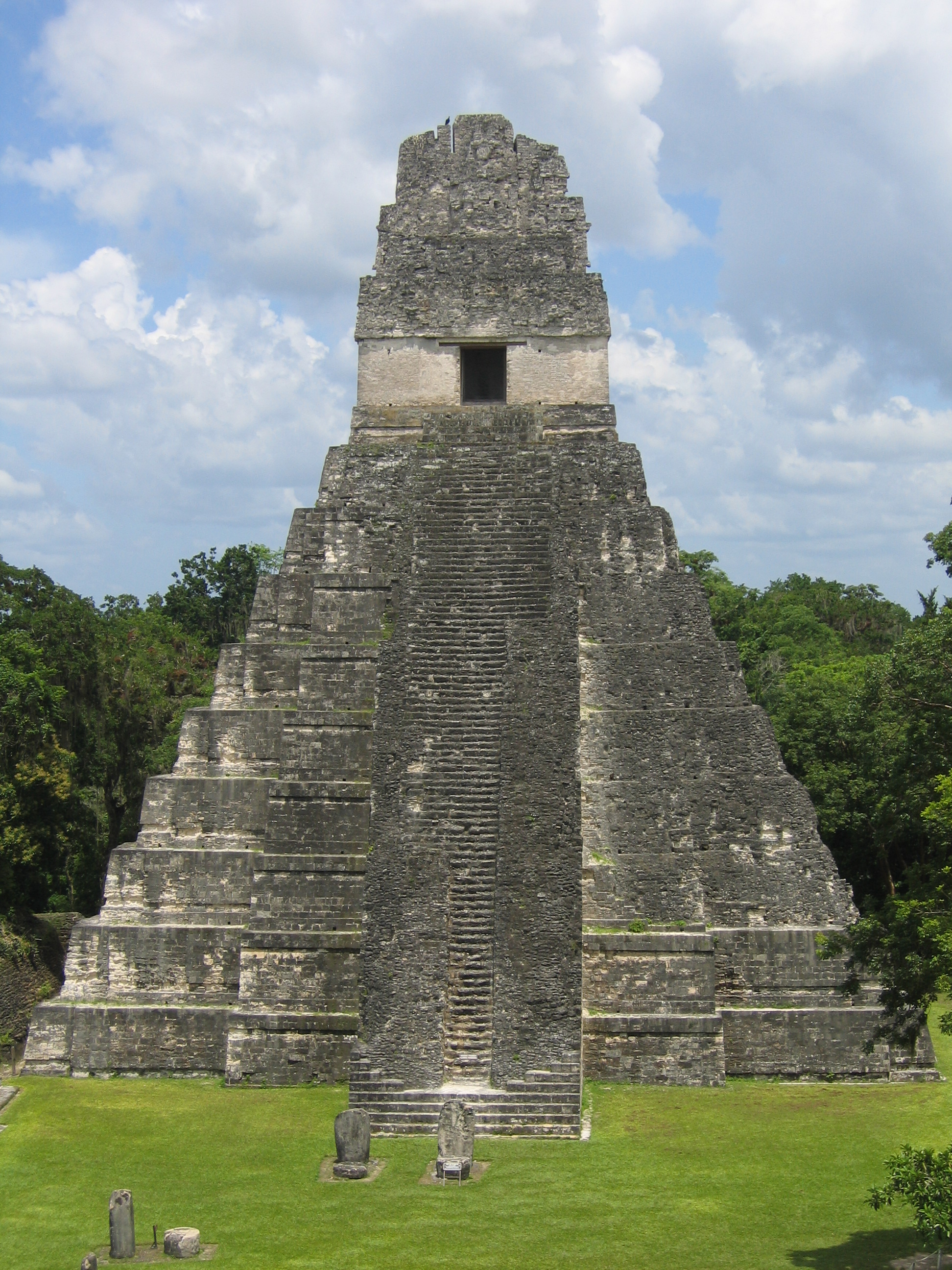
Scenes of the rebel base on Yavin 4 were filmed in Tikal, Guatemala

According to Taylor, it was impossible to light the Elstree sets in the conventional way. He was forced to break open the walls, ceilings and floors, placing quartz lamps inside the openings he created. This lighting system gave Lucas the ability to shoot in almost any direction without extensive relighting. In total, filming in Britain took fourteen and a half weeks.

While visiting an English travel agency, Lucas saw a poster depicting Tikal, Guatemala, and decided to use the location for the moon Yavin 4. The scenes of the rebel base on Yavin were filmed in the local Mayan temples. The animation of the Death Star plans shown at the base were created by the computer programmer Larry Cuba, using the GRASS programming language. It is the only digital computer animation utilized in the original version of Star Wars. The visual simulation of Yavin 4 orbiting its mother planet was created on the Scanimate analog computer. All the other computer monitors and targeting displays in the film featured simulated computer graphics, which were generated using pre-digital animation methods, such as hand-drawn backlit animation.

While in Tunisia, Lucas changed the script to kill off Obi-Wan during the fight with Vader. Lucas said he added the death of a main character to emphasize the danger of the Death Star; Obi-Wan was chosen because he served little narrative purpose after his duel with Vader. In April 1976, Guinness wrote in his diary "...I regret having embarked on the film. ...the dialogue, which is lamentable, keeps being changed and only slightly improved." In 1999, Guinness claimed that he persuaded Lucas to kill Obi-Wan as he disliked the "awful" dialogue.

At Fox, Alan Ladd endured scrutiny from board members over the film's complex screenplay and rising budget. After the filmmakers requested more than the original $8 million budget, Kurtz said the executives started worrying. According to Kurtz, the filmmaking team spent two weeks drafting a new budget. Ladd reluctantly released an extra $50,000 in funding (equivalent to $270,000 in 2025 dollars). With the project behind schedule, Ladd told Lucas he had to finish production within a week or it would be shut down. The crew split into three units, led by Lucas, Kurtz, and production supervisor Robert Watts. Under the new system, they met the studio's deadline.

During production, the cast attempted to make Lucas laugh or smile, as he often appeared depressed. At one point, the project became so demanding that Lucas was diagnosed with hypertension and exhaustion and was warned to reduce his stress level. Another obstacle arose when Hamill's face became visibly scarred in a car accident, which restricted re-shoots featuring Luke.

=== Post-production ===
Star Wars was originally slated for release on December 25, 1976, but production delays pushed it back to mid-1977. Editor John Jympson began cutting the film while Lucas was still filming in Tunisia; as Lucas noted, the editor was in an "impossible position" because Lucas had not explained any of the film's material to him. When Lucas viewed Jympson's rough cut, he felt the editor's selection of takes was questionable. He felt Jympson did not fully understand the film nor Lucas' style of filmmaking, and he continued to disapprove of Jympson's editing as time went by. Halfway through production, Lucas fired Jympson and replaced him with Paul Hirsch, Richard Chew, and his then-wife, Marcia Lucas. The new editing team felt Jympson's cut lacked excitement, and they sought to inject more dynamism into the film.

Jympson's rough cut of Star Wars (often called the "Lost Cut") differed significantly from the final version. The author David West Reynolds describes Jympson's version as slower-paced, and estimates that it contained 30–40% different footage from the final cut. Although most of the differences relate to extended scenes or alternate takes, there were also scenes in this version which were completely removed to accelerate the pace of the narrative. The most notable of these was a series of scenes from Tatooine, when Luke is first introduced. The scenes depicted Luke's everyday life among his friends in the city of Anchorhead, and showed how their lives are affected by the space battle above the planet. These scenes also introduced Biggs Darklighter, Luke's closest friend who leaves to join the Rebellion. Hirsch said the scenes were removed because they presented too much information in the first few minutes of the film, and they created too many storylines for the audience to follow. The removal of the Anchorhead scenes also helped distinguish Star Wars from Lucas' previous film; Alan Ladd called the deleted scenes "American Graffiti in outer space". Lucas also wanted to shift the narrative focus to C-3PO and R2-D2 at the beginning of the film. He felt that having the first thirty minutes of the film be mainly about robots was a "bold idea". A scene between Han Solo and a human Jabba the Hutt (Declan Mulholland) was filmed but cut because camera problems left Lucas dissatisfied with the result. (Note: Lucas has since claimed that he had intended to replace Mulholland with a stop-motion alien, and that the scene was cut for technical and budgetary limitations. Michael Kaminski challenged this account and argued that the character was originally meant to be human, citing that production notes contain no references to replacing Mulholland, and notes that Lucas envisioned Jabba as a slug-like alien only as early as 1979. Lucas reinstated the scene for the film's 1997 Special Edition with a CGI animated Jabba superimposed over Mulholland.) The narrative information was incorporated into Han's confrontation with bounty hunter Greedo.

Meanwhile, ILM was struggling to achieve unprecedented special effects. The company had spent half its budget on four shots that Lucas deemed unacceptable. With hundreds of shots remaining, ILM was forced to finish a year's work in six months. To inspire the visual effects team, Lucas spliced together clips of kinetic aerial dogfights from old war films; he had taped many of these clips from television in late 1973 whilst writing Star Wars. The explosion of the Death Star was created by the visual effects artist Bruce Logan and the pyrotechnics expert Joe Viskocil. To simulate an explosion in outer space, Logan pointed a high-speed camera upward at a series of miniature bombs composed of black powder, gasoline, titanium chips and napalm. The camera was surrounded by a sheet of plywood, with a hole cut out for the lens and a sheet of glass covering it. (Note: Attributed to multiple references:)

Sound designer Ben Burtt created a library of sounds that Lucas referred to as an "organic soundtrack". Blaster sounds were created by modifying the noise of a steel cable being struck while under tension. Lightsaber sound effects were a combination of the hum of movie projector motors and interference caused by a television set on a shieldless microphone. Burtt discovered the interference sound accidentally while searching for a buzzing, sparking sound to add to the projector hum. For Chewbacca's speech, Burtt combined the sounds of four bears, a badger, a lion, a seal, and a walrus. He achieved Vader's breathing noise by breathing through the mask of a scuba regulator. (Note: The sound design inspired the backstory of Vader being nearly killed during a duel with Obi-Wan and suffering injuries from lava.) R2-D2's beeps and squeaks were made by Burtt imitating baby noises over an intercom and mixing the sounds together using a synthesizer. The film was mixed in a new six-track stereo layout developed by Dolby Laboratories called "baby boom" that consolidated vocals to the center channel, while the side channels were used to enhance deep bass effects.

In February 1977, Lucas screened an early cut of the film for Fox executives, several director friends, and Roy Thomas and Howard Chaykin of Marvel Comics, who were preparing a Star Wars comic book. The cut had a different crawl from the finished version and used Prowse's voice for Vader. It also lacked most special effects; hand-drawn arrows took the place of blaster beams, and footage of World War II dogfights replaced space battles between TIE fighters and the Millennium Falcon. Several of Lucas' friends failed to understand the film, and their reactions disappointed Lucas. Marcia Lucas also was unhappy with the early cut. Steven Spielberg enjoyed it, and believed the lack of enthusiasm from others was due to the absence of finished special effects. Ladd and the other studio executives also loved the film; production executive Gareth Wigan described the experience as the most extraordinary day of his life. Lucas, who was accustomed to negative reactions from studio leadership, found the enthusiasm of the Fox executives shocking and rewarding.

Star Wars was completed less than a week before its May 25, 1977, release date. With all of the film's elements coming together just in time, Lucas described the work as not so much finished as "abandoned". Star Wars began production with a budget of $8 million; the total budget eventually reached $11 million (equivalent to $48 and $62 million, respectively, in 2025).

== Soundtrack ==
Lucas initially planned to use pre-existing music for Star Wars, rather than an original score. Since the film portrayed alien worlds, he believed recognizable music was needed to create a sense of familiarity. He hired John Williams as a music consultant, and showed him a collection of orchestral pieces he intended to use for the soundtrack. After Williams convinced Lucas that an original score would be preferable, Lucas tasked him with creating it. A few of the composer's finished pieces were influenced by Lucas' initial orchestral selections. The "Main Title Theme" was inspired by the theme from the 1942 film Kings Row, scored by Erich Wolfgang Korngold, and the "Dune Sea of Tatooine" was influenced by the music of the 1948 film Bicycle Thieves, scored by Alessandro Cicognini. Lucas later denied he ever considered using pre-existing music for the film.

Over a period of 12 days in March 1977, Williams and the London Symphony Orchestra recorded the Star Wars score. The soundtrack was released as a double LP in 1977 by 20th Century Fox Records. In 2005, the American Film Institute chose the Star Wars soundtrack as the best film score of all time.

== Marketing ==
A rendition of Dan Perri's early Star Wars logotype

While the film was in production, a logo was commissioned from Dan Perri, a title sequence designer who had worked on The Exorcist (1973) and Taxi Driver (1976). Perri created a logotype consisting of block-capital letters filled with stars and leaning towards a vanishing point. The graphic was designed to follow the same perspective as the opening text crawl. Ultimately, Perri's logo was not used for the film's opening title sequence, although it was used widely in pre-release print advertising and on cinema marquees.

The logotype that was eventually used in Star Wars and subsequent media in the franchise

The logotype eventually selected for on-screen use originated in a promotional brochure that was distributed by Fox to cinema owners in 1976. The brochure was designed by Suzy Rice, a young art director at the Los Angeles advertising agency Seiniger Advertising. On a visit to ILM in Van Nuys, Rice was instructed by Lucas to produce a "very fascist" logo that would intimidate the viewer. Rice employed an outlined and modified Helvetica Black typeface in her initial version. After some feedback from Lucas, Rice joined the S and T of STAR and the R and S of WARS. Kurtz was impressed with Rice's composition and selected it over Perri's design for the film's opening titles, after flattening the pointed tips of the letter W. ILM artist Joe Johnston was responsible for stacking the two words to create the final graphic. The Star Wars logo became one of the most recognizable designs in cinema, though Rice was not credited in the film.

For the film's US release, Fox commissioned a promotional poster from the advertising agency Smolen, Smith and Connolly. The agency contracted the freelance artist Tom Jung, and gave him the phrase "good over evil" as a starting point. His poster, known as Style 'A', depicts Luke standing in a heroic pose, brandishing a shining lightsaber above his head. Leia is slightly below him, and a large image of Vader's helmet looms behind them. Some Fox executives considered this poster "too dark" and commissioned the Brothers Hildebrandt, a pair of well-known fantasy artists, to modify it for the UK release. When Star Wars opened in British theaters, the Hildebrandts' Style 'B' poster was used on cinema billboards. Fox and Lucasfilm later decided to promote the film with a less stylized and more realistic depiction of the lead characters, and commissioned a new design from Tom Chantrell. Two months after Star Wars opened, the Hildebrandts' poster was replaced by Chantrell's Style 'C' version in UK cinemas. (Note: Attributed to multiple references:)

Fox gave Star Wars little marketing support beyond licensed T-shirts and posters. The film's marketing director, Charley Lippincott, had to look elsewhere for promotional opportunities. He secured deals with Marvel Comics for a comic book adaptation and with Del Rey Books for a novelization. A fan of science fiction, Lippincott used his contacts to promote the film at San Diego Comic-Con and elsewhere within the science-fiction community.

== Release ==
=== MPAA rating ===
When Star Wars was submitted to the Motion Picture Association of America's rating board, the votes for the rating were evenly split between G and PG. In an unusual move, Fox requested the stricter PG rating, in part because it believed the film was too scary for young children, but also because it feared teenagers would perceive the G rating as "uncool". Lippincott supported Fox's position after witnessing a five-year-old at a preview screening become upset by a scene in which Darth Vader chokes a rebel captain. Although the board initially opted for the G rating, it reneged after Fox's request and applied the PG rating.

=== First public screening ===
On May 1, 1977, the first public screening of Star Wars was held at Northpoint Theatre in San Francisco, where American Graffiti had been test-screened four years earlier. (Note: Attributed to multiple references:)

=== Premiere and initial release ===
Lucas wanted the film released in May, on the Memorial Day weekend. According to Fox executive Gareth Wigan, "Nobody had ever opened a summer film before school was out." Lucas, however, hoped the school-year release would build word-of-mouth publicity among children. Fox ultimately decided on a release date of May 25, the Wednesday before the holiday weekend. Very few theaters, however, wanted to show Star Wars. To encourage exhibitors to purchase the film, Fox packaged it with the film The Other Side of Midnight. If a theater wanted to show Midnight, it was required to show Star Wars as well.

Star Wars debuted on Wednesday, May 25, 1977, in 32 theaters. Another theater was added on Thursday, and ten more began showing the film on Friday. On Wednesday, Lucas was so absorbed in work—approving advertising campaigns and mixing sound for the film's wider-release version—that he forgot the film was opening that day. His first glimpse of its success occurred that evening, when he and Marcia went out for dinner on Hollywood Boulevard. Across the street, crowds were lining up outside Mann's Chinese Theatre, waiting to see Star Wars.

Two weeks after its release, Lucas' film was replaced by William Friedkin's Sorcerer at Mann's because of contractual obligations. The theater owner moved Star Wars to a less-prestigious location after quickly renovating it. After Sorcerer failed to meet expectations, Lucas' film was given a second opening at Mann's on August 3. Thousands of people attended a ceremony in which C-3PO, R2-D2 and Darth Vader placed their footprints in the theater's forecourt. By this time, Star Wars was playing in 1,096 theaters in the United States. Approximately 60 theaters played the film continuously for over a year. In May 1978, Lucasfilm distributed "Birthday Cake" posters to those theaters for special events on the one-year anniversary of the film's release. Star Wars premiered in the United Kingdom on December 27, 1977. News reports of the film's popularity in America caused long lines to form at the two London theaters that first offered the film; it became available in 12 large cities in January 1978, and additional London theaters in February.

On opening day I ... did a radio call-in show ... this caller, was really enthusiastic and talking about the movie in really deep detail. I said, "You know a lot about the film." He said, "Yeah, yeah, I've seen it four times already."

— Gary Kurtz, on when he realized Star Wars had become a cultural phenomenon

The film immediately broke box office records. Three weeks after it opened, Fox's stock price had doubled to a record high. Prior to 1977, the studio's highest annual profit was $37 million. In 1977, it posted a profit of $79 million. Lucas instantly became very wealthy, leading his friend Francis Ford Coppola to ask him for money to finish Apocalypse Now. Cast members became instant household names, and even technical crew members, such as model makers, were asked for autographs. When Harrison Ford visited a record store to buy an album, enthusiastic fans tore half his shirt off.

Lucas had been certain Spielberg's Close Encounters of the Third Kind would outperform his space opera at the box office. Before Star Wars opened, Lucas proposed to Spielberg that they trade 2.5% of the profit on each other's films. Spielberg accepted, believing Lucas' film would be the bigger hit. Spielberg still receives 2.5% of the profits from Star Wars.

=== Box office ===
Star Wars remains one of the most financially successful films of all time. It earned over $2.5 million in its first six days ($13.6 million in 2025 dollars), including $1.5 million during its first weekend (8.26 million in 2025). According to Variety's weekly box office charts, it was number one at the US box office for its first three weeks. It was dethroned by The Deep, but gradually added screens and returned to number one in its seventh week, building up to $7-million weekends ($37.2 million in 2025) as it entered wide release, and remaining number one for the next 15 weeks. It replaced Jaws as the highest-earning film in the United States and Canada just six months into release, eventually grossing $221.3 million during its initial theatrical run ($1.18 billion in 2025 dollars). Star Wars entered international release towards the end of the year, and in 1978 became the highest-grossing film of all time worldwide. Its biggest international market was Japan, where it grossed $58.4 million.

Star Wars was still playing in 38 US theaters fourteen months after its initial release. On July 21, 1978, it was expanded to 1,744 theaters, and set a new US weekend record of $10.2 million. The $43.8 million gross from this expansion brought its total domestic gross to over $265 million. Theatrical re-releases in 1979 ($22.5 million), 1981 ($17.2 million), and 1982 ($18 million) brought its cumulative gross in the US and Canada to $323 million, and extended its global earnings to $530 million. Star Wars became the first film to gross $500 million worldwide, and remained the highest-grossing film of all time until E.T. the Extra-Terrestrial set a new record in 1983.

The theatrical release of the Star Wars Special Edition in 1997 was the highest-grossing reissue of all-time at $138.3 million, bringing the film's total gross in the US and Canada to $461 million, which led it to reclaim the all-time number one rank for domestic gross. (Note: Attributed to multiple references:) Internationally, the re-release grossed $117.2 million, with $26 million from the United Kingdom and $15 million from Japan. In total, Star Wars has grossed $775.4 million worldwide. In 2011, Guinness World Records estimated that it was the third-highest-grossing film worldwide, adjusted for inflation. In the United States and Canada, it ranks second behind Gone with the Wind (1939) on the inflation-adjusted list.

== Reception ==
=== Critical response ===
According to Entertainment Weekly, many reviewers in 1977 were "overwhelmed" by Star Wars' charms, with particular praise going to C-3PO, R2-D2 and the Tatooine cantina scene. In the United States, Roger Ebert of the Chicago Sun-Times called the film "an out-of-body experience", while Vincent Canby of The New York Times described it as "the most elaborate ... most beautiful movie serial ever made". A. D. Murphy of Variety called the film magnificent, claiming that Lucas had succeeded in his attempt to create the "biggest possible adventure fantasy" based on the serials and action epics of his childhood. Gary Arnold of The Washington Post called the film "a new classic in a rousing movie tradition: a space swashbuckler". Gerald Clarke of Time called Star Wars "grand and glorious" and a "subliminal history of the movies, wrapped in a riveting tale of suspense and adventure, ornamented with some of the most ingenious special effects ever contrived for film". Gene Siskel of the Chicago Tribune thought Star Wars was a fun film with "spectacular" visual effects, but "not a great movie in the sense that it describes the human condition".

In a negative review, Pauline Kael of The New Yorker wrote that Star Wars lacked "emotional grip". John Simon of New York magazine found the film boring, writing, "Strip Star Wars of its often striking images and its highfalutin scientific jargon, and you get a story, characters, and dialogue of overwhelming banality." Writing in The Nation, Robert Hatch called the film a "compilation of nonsense, largely derived but thoroughly reconditioned". Nevertheless, he predicted it would become a classic. Jonathan Rosenbaum of the Chicago Reader thought the characters of Star Wars lacked depth and existed merely to "keep the action going". Peter Keough of the Boston Phoenix called the film "a junkyard of cinematic gimcracks not unlike the Jawas' heap of purloined, discarded, barely functioning droids".

In the United Kingdom, Barry Norman of Film... called Star Wars "sublime" family entertainment that combines "all the best-loved themes of romantic adventure". The Daily Telegraph's science correspondent Adrian Berry described it as one of the most exciting films in the "space melodrama" genre, and the best since 2001: A Space Odyssey (1968). He described the plot as "unpretentious and pleasantly devoid of any 'message'".

In a 1978 appearance on The Tonight Show Starring Johnny Carson, the scientist Carl Sagan called attention to the overwhelming whiteness of the human characters in the film. Actor Raymond St. Jacques echoed Sagan's complaint, writing that "the terrifying realization ... [is] that black people (or any ethnic minority for that matter) shall not exist in the galactic space empires of the future". (Note: A few black extras appear in Mos Eisley external shots, which were filmed in Tunisia. Having modeled the evil Galactic Empire upon the infamous Nazis, Lucas was surprised by accusations that Star Wars promoted racism. (Note: Attributed to multiple references:)) Writing in the African-American newspaper New Journal and Guide, Walter Bremond claimed that due to his black garb and his being voiced by a black actor, the villainous Vader reinforces a stereotype that "black is evil". Bremond went on to call Star Wars "one of the most racist movies ever produced".

The film continues to receive critical acclaim from contemporary critics. On the review aggregator website Rotten Tomatoes, 93% of 210 critics' reviews are positive, with an average rating of 9.3/10. The website's consensus reads: "A legendarily expansive and ambitious start to the sci-fi saga, George Lucas opened our eyes to the possibilities of blockbuster filmmaking and things have never been the same." Metacritic, which uses a weighted average, assigned the film a score of 90 out of 100, based on 24 critics, indicating "universal acclaim". In his 1997 review of the film's 20th-anniversary Special Edition release, Michael Wilmington of the Chicago Tribune called it a "grandiose and violent epic with a simple and whimsical heart". SFGate described the Special Edition version as "a thrilling experience". In 2001 Matt Ford of the BBC wrote, "Star Wars isn't the best film ever made, but it is universally loved." Reviewing the 2006 DVD release, Andrew Collins of Empire magazine said that Star Wars' "timeless appeal lies in its easily identified, universal archetypes—goodies to root for, baddies to boo, a princess to be rescued and so on—and if it is most obviously dated to the 70s by the special effects, so be it". CinemaScore reported that audiences for the film's 1999 re-release gave the film an "A+" grade.

=== Accolades ===
Star Wars won many awards after its release, including six Academy Awards, two BAFTA Awards, one Golden Globe Award, three Grammy Awards, one Hugo Award, and thirteen Saturn Awards. Additionally, the Academy of Motion Picture Arts and Sciences gave a Special Achievement Academy Award to Ben Burtt, and granted a Scientific and Engineering Award to John Dykstra, Alvah J. Miller, and Jerry Jeffress for the development of the Dykstraflex camera system.

Organization	Category	Nominee	Result
Academy Awards	Best Picture	Gary Kurtz	Nominated
Academy Awards	Best Director	George Lucas	Nominated
Academy Awards	Best Supporting Actor	Alec Guinness	Nominated
Academy Awards	Best Original Screenplay	George Lucas	Nominated
Academy Awards	Best Art Direction	John Barry, Norman Reynolds, Leslie Dilley and Roger Christian	Won
Academy Awards	Best Costume Design	John Mollo	Won
Academy Awards	Best Film Editing	Paul Hirsch, Marcia Lucas and Richard Chew	Won
Academy Awards	Best Original Score	John Williams	Won
Academy Awards	Best Sound	Don MacDougall, Ray West, Bob Minkler and Derek Ball	Won
Academy Awards	Best Visual Effects	John Stears, John Dykstra, Richard Edlund, Grant McCune and Robert Blalack	Won
Academy Awards	Special Achievement Academy Award	Ben Burtt	Won
Academy Awards	Scientific and Engineering Award	John Dykstra, Alvah J. Miller and Jerry Jeffress	Won
American Music Awards	Favorite Pop/Rock Album	John Williams	Nominated
BAFTA Awards	Best Film	Gary Kurtz	Nominated
BAFTA Awards	Best Costume Design	John Mollo	Nominated
BAFTA Awards	Best Editing	Paul Hirsch, Marcia Lucas and Richard Chew	Nominated
BAFTA Awards	Best Original Music	John Williams	Won
BAFTA Awards	Best Production Design	John Barry	Nominated
BAFTA Awards	Best Sound	Sam Shaw, Robert Rutledge, Gordon Davidson, Gene Corso, Derek Ball, Don MacDougall, Bob Minkler, Ray West, Michael Minkler, Les Fresholtz, Richard Portman and Ben Burtt	Won
Directors Guild of America Awards	Outstanding Directing – Feature Film	George Lucas	Nominated
Golden Globe Awards	Best Motion Picture – Drama	Gary Kurtz	Nominated
Golden Globe Awards	Best Director	George Lucas	Nominated
Golden Globe Awards	Best Supporting Actor – Motion Picture	Alec Guinness	Nominated
Golden Globe Awards	Best Original Score	John Williams	Won
Grammy Awards	Best Instrumental Composition	John Williams	Won
Grammy Awards	Best Original Score Written for a Motion Picture or a Television Special	John Williams	Won
Grammy Awards	Best Pop Instrumental Performance	John Williams	Won
Hugo Awards	Best Dramatic Presentation	George Lucas	Won
Saturn Awards	Best Science Fiction Film	Gary Kurtz	Won
Saturn Awards	Best Director	George Lucas	Won
Saturn Awards	Best Actor	Harrison Ford	Nominated
Saturn Awards	Best Actor	Mark Hamill	Nominated
Saturn Awards	Best Actress	Carrie Fisher	Nominated
Saturn Awards	Best Supporting Actor	Alec Guinness	Won
Saturn Awards	Best Supporting Actor	Peter Cushing	Nominated
Saturn Awards	Best Writing	George Lucas	Won
Saturn Awards	Best Costume Design	John Mollo	Won
Saturn Awards	Best Make-up	Rick Baker and Stuart Freeborn	Won
Saturn Awards	Best Music	John Williams	Won
Saturn Awards	Best Special Effects	John Dykstra and John Stears	Won
Saturn Awards	Best Art Direction	Norman Reynolds and Leslie Dilley	Honored
Saturn Awards	Best Cinematography	Gilbert Taylor	Honored
Saturn Awards	Best Editing	Paul Hirsch, Marcia Lucas and Richard Chew	Honored
Saturn Awards	Best Set Decoration	Roger Christian	Honored
Saturn Awards	Best Sound	Ben Burtt and Don MacDougall	Honored
Writers Guild of America Awards	Best Original Screenplay	George Lucas	Nominated

In its May 30, 1977 issue, Time named Star Wars the "Movie of the Year". Star Wars was voted the second most popular film by Americans in a 2008 nationwide poll conducted by the market research firm Harris Interactive. It has also been featured in several high-profile audience polls: In 1997, it ranked as the 10th Greatest American Film on the Los Angeles Daily News Readers' Poll; in 2002, Star Wars and its sequel The Empire Strikes Back were voted the greatest films ever made in Channel 4's 100 Greatest Films poll; in 2011, Star Wars ranked as Best Sci-Fi Film on Best in Film: The Greatest Movies of Our Time, a primetime special aired by ABC that ranked the best films as chosen by fans, based on results of a poll conducted by ABC and People magazine; and in 2014, the film placed 11th in a poll by The Hollywood Reporter, which balloted every studio, agency, publicity firm, and production house in the Hollywood region.

AFI 100 Years... series

- AFI's 100 Years...100 Movies (1998) – #15
- AFI's 100 Years...100 Thrills (2001) – #27
- AFI's 100 Years...100 Heroes & Villains (2003):
  - Han Solo – #14 Hero
  - Obi-Wan Kenobi – #37 Hero
- AFI's 100 Years...100 Movie Quotes (2004):
  - "May the Force be with you." – #8
- AFI's 100 Years of Film Scores (2005) – #1
- AFI's 100 Years...100 Cheers (2006) – #39
- AFI's 100 Years...100 Movies (10th Anniversary Edition) (2007) – #13
- AFI's 10 Top 10 (2008) – #2 Sci-Fi Film

— American Film Institute

In 2008, Empire magazine ranked Star Wars 22nd on its list of the "500 Greatest Movies of All Time". In 2010, the film ranked among the "All-Time 100" list of the greatest films as chosen by Time film critic Richard Schickel.

In 2006, Lucas' screenplay was selected by the Writers Guild of America as the 68th greatest of all time. In 1989, the United States Library of Congress named Star Wars among its first selections to the National Film Registry as being "culturally, historically, or aesthetically significant"—at the time, it was the most recent film to be selected and it was the only film from the 1970s to be chosen. In 1991, Star Wars was one of the first 25 films inducted into the Producers Guild of America's Hall of Fame for setting "an enduring standard for American entertainment". The film's soundtrack was added to the United States National Recording Registry in 2004. The lack of a commercially available version of the original 1977 theatrical edit of the film since early 1980s VHS releases has motivated fans to create numerous restorations, such as Harmy's Despecialized Edition.

In addition to the film's multiple awards and nominations, Star Wars has also been recognized by the American Film Institute on several of its lists. The film ranks first on 100 Years of Film Scores, second on Top 10 Sci-Fi Films, 15th on 100 Years ... 100 Movies (ranked 13th on the updated 10th-anniversary edition), 27th on 100 Years ... 100 Thrills, and 39th on 100 Years ... 100 Cheers. In addition, the quote "May the Force be with you" is ranked eighth on 100 Years ... 100 Movie Quotes, and Han Solo and Obi-Wan Kenobi are ranked as the 14th and 37th greatest heroes respectively on 100 Years ... 100 Heroes & Villains.

The February 2020 issue of New York Magazine listed Star Wars as among "The Best Movies That Lost Best Picture at the Oscars".

== Post-release ==
=== Theatrical re-releases ===
Star Wars was re-released theatrically in 1978, 1979, 1981, and 1982. The subtitles Episode IV and A New Hope were added for the 1981 re-release. (Note: In The Cinema of George Lucas, Marcus Hearn claims the title was changed earlier, in July 1978.) This brought the film into line with its 1980 sequel, which was titled on-screen as Star Wars: Episode V—The Empire Strikes Back. Lucas claims the subtitles were intended from the beginning, but were dropped for Star Wars to avoid confusing audiences. Kurtz said they considered calling the first film Episode III, IV, or V, to capture the experience of encountering a Flash Gordon serial halfway through its run. However, Michael Kaminski and Chris Taylor point out that multiple early screenplay drafts of Star Wars were subtitled "Episode One" and that early drafts of Empire were called "Episode II".

In 1997, Star Wars was digitally remastered with some altered scenes for a theatrical re-release, dubbed the "Special Edition". In 2010, Lucas announced that all six previously released Star Wars films would be scanned and transferred to 3D for a theatrical release, but only 3D versions of the prequel trilogy were completed before the franchise was sold to Disney in 2012. In 2013, Star Wars became the first major motion picture to be dubbed into the Navajo language. In 2025, the film's original print was screened—for the first time since its initial theatrical run—at a British Film Institute event.

In honor of Star Wars' 50th anniversary, the film will be re-released to theaters on February 19, 2027. The version shown will be a newly restored version of the original theatrical cut from 1977. (Note: Attributed to multiple references:)

==== Special Edition ====
The theatrical release poster for the 1997 Special Edition An editor has nominated the above file for discussion of its purpose and/or potential deletion. You are welcome to participate in the discussion and help reach a consensus.

For its 20th anniversary in 1997, Star Wars and its two sequels were digitally remastered—with updated effects and re-edited scenes—and re-released to theaters as "Special Editions". The Special Edition of Star Wars contains 277 enhanced shots that were unachievable in the original film due to financial, technological and time constraints. Many fans believe that these changes negatively impacted the film. A particularly controversial change where Greedo was edited to shoot at Han Solo inspired the saying "Han shot first".

"To me, the special edition ones are the films I wanted to make. Anybody that makes films knows the film is never finished. It's abandoned or it's ripped out of your hands... I'm sorry you saw half a completed film and fell in love with it. But I want it to be the way I want it to be."

— George Lucas, in a 2004 interview on the Special Editions

Star Wars required extensive recovery of misfiled footage and restoration of the whole film before Lucas' modifications could be made. Part of the film negative used Color Reversal Internegative (CRI) film, a unique reversal stock which deteriorated faster than typical negative stocks. As a result, every CRI shot had to be removed and cleaned separately from the negative portions. Once cleaning was complete, the film was digitally scanned for restoration. In many cases, entire scenes had to be reconstructed from their individual elements. Digital compositing also enabled the restoration team to correct for problems such as misalignment of mattes and blue-spill. The process of creating the new visual effects was explored in Ben Burtt's 1996 documentary Special Effects: Anything Can Happen. The enhancement of the films for the Special Editions also allowed ILM to test digital effects for the upcoming Star Wars prequel trilogy.

In 1989, the 1977 theatrical version of Star Wars was selected for preservation by the National Film Registry of the United States Library of Congress. 35 mm reels of the 1997 Special Edition were initially presented for preservation because of the difficulty of transferring from the original prints, but it was later revealed that the Library possessed a copyright deposit print of the original theatrical release. This copy was eventually transferred to a 4K scan, viewable by appointment.

=== Home media ===
Star Wars was initially released in parts by Ken Films on Super 8, and the full film was later released in the format by Derann in 1989. Short scenes were also released on cassettes for the Kenner Movie Viewer toy projector. The film was released on Betamax, CED, LaserDisc, and VHS during the 1980s and 1990s by CBS/Fox Video. The final VHS issue of the original theatrical release (pre-Special Edition) occurred in 1995, with the marketing hook that it was the last chance to own the original version of the film, and was available as part of a trilogy set or as a standalone purchase. It was the first VHS release to be THX certified.

Star Wars was first released on DVD on September 21, 2004, in a box set with The Empire Strikes Back, Return of the Jedi, and a bonus disc of supplementary material. The films were digitally restored and remastered, and more changes were made by Lucas (in addition to those made for the 1997 Special Edition). The DVD features a commentary track from Lucas, Fisher, Burtt and visual effects artist Dennis Muren. The bonus disc contains the 2004 documentary Empire of Dreams: The Story of the Star Wars Trilogy, trailers, and other special features.

The trilogy was re-released on separate two-disc limited edition DVD sets in September 2006, and again in a limited edition box set on November 4, 2008; the original theatrical versions of the films were added as bonus material. The release was met with criticism because the unaltered versions were from the 1993 non-anamorphic LaserDisc masters, and were not re-transferred using modern video standards, which led to problems with colors, image quality, and digital image jarring.

On September 16, 2011, all six Star Wars films that existed at the time were released by 20th Century Fox Home Entertainment on Blu-ray, in three different editions. A New Hope was included in a box set of the original trilogy, and also in the nine-disc set Star Wars: The Complete Saga, which contains the other five films, as well as over 40 hours of special features. (Note: Attributed to multiple references:) Some new alterations were made to the films in these editions, which provoked mixed reactions from some fans.

On April 7, 2015, Walt Disney Studios, Twentieth Century Fox, and Lucasfilm jointly announced the digital releases of the six existing Star Wars films. Fox released A New Hope for digital download on April 10, 2015, while Disney released the other five films. Disney reissued A New Hope on Blu-ray, DVD, and for digital download on September 22, 2019. Additionally, all six films were available for 4K resolution HDR and Dolby Atmos streaming on Disney+ upon the service's launch on November 12, 2019. This version of A New Hope was also released by Disney in a 4K Ultra HD Blu-ray box set on March 31, 2020.

=== Merchandising ===
Little Star Wars merchandise was available for several months after the film's debut, as only Kenner Products had accepted marketing director Charley Lippincott's licensing offers. Kenner responded to the sudden demand for toys by selling boxed vouchers in its "empty box" Christmas campaign. Television commercials told children and parents that vouchers contained in a "Star Wars Early Bird Certificate Package" could be redeemed for four action figures between February and June 1978. Jay West of the Los Angeles Times said that the boxes in the campaign "became the most coveted empty box[es] in the history of retail". In 2012, the Star Wars action figures were inducted into the National Toy Hall of Fame.

The novelization of the film was published as Star Wars: From the Adventures of Luke Skywalker by Del Rey Books in December 1976, six months before the film was released. The credited author was George Lucas, but the book was ghostwritten by Alan Dean Foster. By February 1977, a half million copies had been sold. Foster also wrote the sequel novel Splinter of the Mind's Eye (1978) to be adapted as a low-budget film if Star Wars was not a financial success.

Marvel Comics adapted the film as the first six issues of its licensed Star Wars comic book, with the first issue sold in April 1977. The comic was written by Roy Thomas and illustrated by Howard Chaykin. Like the novelization, it contained certain elements, such as the scene with Luke and Biggs, that appeared in the screenplay but not in the finished film. The series was so successful that, according to comic book writer Jim Shooter, it "single-handedly saved Marvel". From January to April 1997, Dark Horse Comics, which had held the comic rights to Star Wars since 1991, published a comic adaptation of the Special Edition version of the film. In September 2013, Dark Horse began publishing The Star Wars, an adaptation of Lucas' original rough draft screenplay.

In 1979, Lucasfilm adapted Star Wars for a children's book-and-record set. The 24-page read-along book was accompanied by a 33 1/3 rpm 7-inch phonograph record. Each page of the book contained a cropped frame from the movie with a condensed version of the story. The record was produced by Buena Vista Records, and its content was copyrighted by Black Falcon, Ltd., a subsidiary of Lucasfilm.

== Cinematic and literary allusions ==
Before creating Star Wars, Lucas had hoped to make a Flash Gordon film, but was unable to obtain the rights. Star Wars features many elements ostensibly derived from Flash Gordon, such as the conflict between rebels and imperial forces; the wipe transitions between scenes; and the text crawl at the beginning of the film. Lucas also reportedly drew from Joseph Campbell's 1949 book The Hero with a Thousand Faces and Akira Kurosawa's 1958 film The Hidden Fortress. Tim Robey of The Telegraph has suggested that the Mos Eisley cantina brawl was influenced by Kurosawa's Yojimbo (1961), and that the scene in which Luke and his friends hide under the floor of the Millennium Falcon was derived from that film's sequel, Sanjuro (1962).

Star Wars has been compared to Frank Herbert's Dune novel series. Both have desert planets: Star Wars has Tatooine, while Dune has Arrakis. Star Wars makes references to spice mines and a spice freighter; Arrakis is the source of a longevity spice. Jedi mind tricks in Star Wars have been compared to "The Voice", a mind-controlling ability used by the Bene Gesserit in Herbert's novels. Luke's Uncle Owen and Aunt Beru are moisture farmers; on Arrakis, Fremen use dew collectors to recycle water. Herbert said that David Lynch, the director of the 1984 film adaptation of Dune, "had trouble with the fact that Star Wars used up so much of Dune". Herbert and Lynch found sixteen points of similarity between the two universes, and argued that these parallels could not be a coincidence.

Writing for Starwars.com in 2013, Bryan Young noted many similarities between Star Wars and the World War II film The Dam Busters (1955). In Star Wars, rebel ships assault the Death Star by diving into a trench and attempting to fire torpedoes into a small exhaust port; in Dam Busters, British bombers fly along heavily defended reservoirs and aim bouncing bombs at dams to cripple the heavy industry of Germany. (Note: In addition, the special effects sequences in Dam Busters were filmed by Star Wars cinematographer Gilbert Taylor.) Lucas used clips from both Dam Busters and 1964's 633 Squadron—another war film with a climactic bomber run through narrow fjords—to illustrate his vision for dogfights in Star Wars. Star Wars has also been compared to Metropolis (1927) and The Wizard of Oz (1939).

== Legacy and influence ==
=== In popular culture ===
Star Wars and subsequent films in the franchise have been explicitly referenced and satirized across a wide range of media. Hardware Wars, released in 1978, was one of the first fan films to parody Star Wars. It received positive critical reaction, earned over $1 million (equivalent to $4.9 million in 2025 dollars), and is one of Lucas' favorite Star Wars spoofs. (Note: Attributed to multiple references:) Frank DeCaro of The New York Times wrote that Star Wars "littered pop culture of the late 1970s with a galaxy of space junk". He cited Quark (a 1977 sitcom that parodied science fiction) and Donny & Marie (a 1970s variety show that featured a 10-minute musical adaptation of Star Wars) as "television's two most infamous examples". Mel Brooks' Spaceballs, a satirical comic science-fiction parody, was released in 1987 to mixed reviews. Lucas permitted Brooks to make a spoof of the film under "one incredibly big restriction: no action figures". In the 1990s and 2000s, the television shows Family Guy, Robot Chicken, and The Simpsons produced episodes satirizing the Star Wars films. A Nerdist article published in 2021 argues that Star Wars is the most influential film in history, partly on the basis that if every copy of the film disappeared, the entire film could possibly be recreated using other media, including parodies.

Many elements of Star Wars are prominent in popular culture. Darth Vader, Han Solo, and Yoda were all named in the top twenty of the British Film Institute's "Best Sci-Fi Characters of All-Time" list. The expressions "Evil empire" and "May the Force be with you" have become part of the popular lexicon. To commemorate the film's 30th anniversary in May 2007, the United States Postal Service issued a set of 15 stamps depicting the characters of the franchise. Approximately 400 mailboxes across the U.S. were designed to look like R2-D2 for the anniversary.

Star Wars and Lucas are the subject of the 2010 documentary film The People vs. George Lucas, which explores filmmaking and fandom as they pertain to the film franchise and its creator. Harrison Ford, who subsequently starred in the Indiana Jones series (1981–2023), Blade Runner (1982), and Witness (1985), told the Daily Mirror that Star Wars "boosted" his career. Star Wars also spawned the Star Wars Holiday Special, which aired on CBS on November 17, 1978. The special is often considered a failure, and Lucas himself disowned it.

On May 4, 2027, Lucasfilm will release the documentary The Hero Awakens on Disney+. Directed by R. J. Cutler, the film covers the making of Star Wars, featuring archival footage and audio captured during the film's production.

=== Cinematic influence ===
In his book The Great Movies, Roger Ebert called Star Wars "a technical watershed" that influenced many subsequent films. It began a new generation of special effects and high-energy motion pictures, and was one of the first films to link genres together to invent a new, high-concept genre for filmmakers to build upon. Along with Steven Spielberg's Jaws, it shifted the film industry's focus away from the more personal filmmaking of the 1970s towards fast-paced, big-budget blockbusters for younger audiences.

Filmmakers who have been influenced by Star Wars include J. J. Abrams, James Cameron, Guillermo del Toro, Dean Devlin, Gareth Edwards, Roland Emmerich, David Fincher, Peter Jackson, John Lasseter, Damon Lindelof, Christopher Nolan, Ridley Scott, John Singleton, Kevin Smith, and Joss Whedon. Lucas' concept of the "used future" was employed in Scott's films Alien (1979) and Blade Runner (1982); Cameron's Aliens (1986) and The Terminator (1984); and Jackson's The Lord of the Rings trilogy.

Some critics have complained that Star Wars, as well as Jaws, "ruined" Hollywood by shifting its focus from "sophisticated" films such as The Godfather, Taxi Driver, and Annie Hall to films about spectacle and juvenile fantasy. On a 1977 episode of Sneak Previews, Gene Siskel said he hoped Hollywood would continue to cater to audiences who enjoy "serious pictures". Peter Biskind claimed that Lucas and Spielberg "returned the 1970s audience, grown sophisticated on a diet of European and New Hollywood films, to the simplicities of the pre-1960s Golden Age of movies ... They marched backward through the looking-glass." In contrast, Tom Shone wrote that through Star Wars and Jaws, Lucas and Spielberg did not betray cinema, but instead "plugged it back into the grid, returning it ... to its roots as a carnival sideshow, a magic act, one big special effect", which amounted to "a kind of rebirth".

== Sequels, prequels, and adaptations ==
Star Wars was followed by the sequels The Empire Strikes Back (1980) and Return of the Jedi (1983), which concluded the original film trilogy. Both were financially successful and fared well with critics. The original trilogy is widely considered one of the best film trilogies in history. (Note: Attributed to multiple references:)

The Story of Star Wars, an audio drama adaptation of the film utilizing some of its music, dialogue, and sound effects, was released as a record album in 1977. A radio drama adaptation of Star Wars was broadcast on the American National Public Radio (NPR) network in 1981. It was written by Brian Daley and directed by John Madden, and was produced with cooperation from George Lucas, who donated the rights to NPR. Williams' music and Burtt's sound design were retained for the show, and Hamill and Daniels reprised their roles. The narrative began with a backstory to the film, recounting Leia's acquisition of the Death Star plans. It also featured scenes not seen in the final cut of the film, such as Luke's observation of the space battle above Tatooine, a skyhopper race, and Vader's interrogation of Leia. The radio version was originally part of the official Star Wars canon, but has since been supplanted by revised canonical narratives.

More than twenty years after the release of Star Wars, Lucas created a prequel trilogy, consisting of the films The Phantom Menace (1999), Attack of the Clones (2002), and Revenge of the Sith (2005). The trilogy chronicles the history between Obi-Wan Kenobi and Anakin Skywalker, concluding with Anakin's fall to the Dark Side and transformation into Darth Vader. The prequel trilogy was financially successful, but certain plot threads and new characters polarized critics and fans. (Note: Attributed to multiple references:) After Lucas sold the Star Wars franchise to the Walt Disney Company in 2012, Disney produced a sequel trilogy, consisting of The Force Awakens (2015), The Last Jedi (2017), and The Rise of Skywalker (2019). (Note: Attributed to multiple references:) Original trilogy cast members including Ford, Hamill, and Fisher reprised their roles. In 2016, Disney released the standalone film Rogue One, which depicts the successful rebel attempt to steal the Death Star plans. It serves as a direct prequel to Star Wars, ending where Star Wars begins. Other standalone films and television series have also been released. (Note: Attributed to multiple references:)

== See also ==
- List of cult films

== Works cited ==
- "Behind the Scenes of Star Wars". American Cinematographer. 58. July 1977.
- Baxter, John (1999). Mythmaker: The Life and Work of George Lucas (1st ed.). New York: William Morrow. ISBN 978-0-380-97833-5.
- Brooker, Will (2009). BFI Film Classics: Star Wars. Palgrave Macmillan. ISBN 978-1-84457-554-1. Archived from the original on September 25, 2019.
- Daniels, Anthony (2019). I Am C-3PO: The Inside Story (Hardback) (1st ed.). DK. ISBN 9780241357606.
- Empire of Dreams: The Story of the Star Wars Trilogy (Documentary film). Disney+. 2004.
- Hidalgo, Pablo; Sansweet, Stephen (2008a). The Complete Star Wars Encyclopedia. Vol. I (First ed.). New York: Del Rey Books. ISBN 9780345477637.
- Hidalgo, Pablo; Sansweet, Stephen (2008c). The Complete Star Wars Encyclopedia. Vol. III (First ed.). New York: Del Rey Books. ISBN 9780345477637.
- Hearn, Marcus (2005). The Cinema of George Lucas. New York: Abrahams Books. ISBN 0-8109-4968-7.
- Kaminski, Michael (2008) [2007]. The Secret History of Star Wars: The Art of Storytelling and the Making of a Modern Epic (3rd ed.). Kingston, Ont.: Legacy Books Press. ISBN 978-0-9784652-3-0. Archived from the original on March 6, 2024.
- Star Wars: A New Hope: The Official Celebration Special (Hardback ed.). Titan Magazines. 2017. ISBN 9781785864605.
- Pollock, Dale (1999). Skywalking: The Life and Films of George Lucas. New York: Da Capo Press. ISBN 0-306-80904-4.
- Rinzler, J.W. (2008) [2007]. The Making of Star Wars: The Definitive Story Behind the Original Film (2008 ed.). Ebury Press. ISBN 978-0-09-192499-7.
- Taylor, Chris (2014). How Star Wars Conquered the Universe: The Past, Present, and Future of a Multibillion Dollar Franchise. Basic Books. ISBN 978-1-784-97059-8.
- Biskind, Peter (1998). Easy Riders, Raging Bulls. New York: Simon & Schuster. ISBN 0-684-80996-6.
- Jones, Brian Jay (2016). George Lucas: A Life. New York: Little, Brown and Company. ISBN 978-0-316-25745-9.
- Berry, Paul (2018). Star Wars Memorabilia: An Unofficial Guide to Star Wars Collectables. Amberley Publishing. ISBN 9781445676456.
