= Dykstraflex =

Digital motion control photography system

The Dykstraflex was the first digital motion control photography camera system, named after its primary developer John Dykstra. Numerous people actually created the camera, with the critical electronics being created by Alvah J. Miller and Jerry Jeffress.

The camera was developed in 1976 specifically for complex special effects shots in Star Wars. Using old VistaVision cameras (for their high image resolution), created by engineers at Paramount Pictures in 1954, and hand wire wrapped TTL chips, the all-digitally controlled system allowed for 7 axes of motion: roll, pan, tilt, swing, boom, traverse, track, lens focus, motor drive, shutter control, and their duplication in multiple takes.

Dykstra's development of this first digital motion control camera system earned himself, Al Miller, and Jerry Jeffress Academy Awards in 1978. The system remained in use at Industrial Light & Magic after Star Wars; by The Empire Strikes Back, ILM was using the original Dykstraflex with a sister camera for matched background photography, and updated versions remained in use until around 1992.

Dykstra once said about his role in developing the Dykstraflex, "George Lucas wanted this moving camera for all of the photography in Star Wars. He was willing to take a risk with the concepts that I advanced with regard to ways for doing that."
