= John Barry (production designer) =

British production designer (1935–1979)

- Barry on a Topps card promoting Superman (1978)
- Born: 3 July 1935; London, England
- Died: 1 June 1979 (aged 43); London, England
- Occupations: Production designer, writer

John Barry (3 July 1935 – 1 June 1979) was a British film production designer, known for his work on Star Wars, for which he received the Academy Award for Best Art Direction.

== Career ==
Born in London on 3 July 1935, Barry worked as an architect with experience in stage design. He entered the film business as a draughtsman on the epic Elizabeth Taylor film Cleopatra in 1963. He went on to assist art director Elliot Scott on the 1960s spy television series Danger Man, which starred Patrick McGoohan. His first project as art director was on the 1968 film Decline and Fall... of a Birdwatcher.

Barry then became production designer on the Clint Eastwood action film Kelly's Heroes in 1970. Barry was offered the job of production designer by Stanley Kubrick for his never-completed film Napoleon, working on the project for a week. Kubrick hired him again as the production designer on A Clockwork Orange in 1971. He was production designer on the 1973 science fiction film Phase IV.

Barry worked on the fantasy musical The Little Prince in 1974. Following a recommendation from Scott, George Lucas travelled to Mexico where Barry was working on Lucky Lady and hired him as production designer for Star Wars. Barry thought the allotted time of seven months to design and build the film's sets was just enough and he took the job.

Barry later worked on Alexander Salkind's Superman and Superman II. Following these box office hits Barry was given the chance to direct his own project, the science fiction film Saturn 3. During filming, Barry fell out with the movie's star Kirk Douglas and was replaced by Stanley Donen.

Barry was soon hired by George Lucas as a second unit director on The Empire Strikes Back. On 31 May 1979, two weeks into filming, he collapsed on-set and was hospitalised with a 104-degree temperature. He died on 1 June of meningitis. His memorial was held on 11 June at St. Paul's Church, Grove Park, Hounslow, London; Barry was cremated that day.
