= Derek Ball =

British sound engineer

- Died: 26 July 1989
- Occupation: Sound engineer
- Years active: 1968–1987

Derek Ball (died 26 July 1989) was a British sound engineer. He won an Academy Award for Best Sound for the film Star Wars. He worked on 40 films between 1968 and 1987.

== Selected filmography ==
- Star Wars Episode IV: A New Hope (1977)
