= Ray West =

American sound engineer (1925–2016)

- Born: George Raymond West; November 29, 1925; Detroit, Michigan, U.S
- Died: February 17, 2016 (aged 90); Santa Barbara, California, U.S.
- Occupation: Sound engineer
- Years active: 1977–1993

George Raymond West (November 29, 1925 – February 17, 2016) was an American sound engineer. He won an Academy Award for Best Sound for the film Star Wars Episode IV: A New Hope. He worked on over 60 films between 1977 and 1993.

West has also done extensive work in television. He was nominated for 13 Emmy Awards and, in 1978, won an award for sound mixing for the NBC television film The Winds of Kitty Hawk (1978), starring Michael Moriarty, and, in 1986, for Unnatural Causes, starring John Ritter.

West died in February 2016 at the age of 90.

== Selected filmography ==
- Star Wars Episode IV: A New Hope (1977)
