= Don MacDougall =

American sound engineer

- Born: Donald W. MacDougall
- Occupation: Sound engineer
- Years active: 1974–1999

Don MacDougall is an American sound engineer. He won an Oscar for Best Sound and was nominated for four more in the same category. He worked on more than 130 films between 1974 and 1999.

== Selected filmography ==
MacDougall won an Academy Award for Best Sound and was nominated for four more.

Won

- Star Wars Episode IV: A New Hope (1977)

Nominated

- Funny Lady (1975)
- Close Encounters of the Third Kind (1977)
- Hooper (1978)
- 1941 (1979)
