= Richard Portman =

American sound engineer

- Born: April 2, 1934; Los Angeles, California, U.S.
- Died: January 28, 2017 (aged 82); Tallahassee, Florida, U.S.
- Occupation: Sound engineer
- Years active: 1963-2004

Richard Portman (April 2, 1934 – January 28, 2017) was an American sound engineer. He won an Academy Award for Best Sound and was nominated for ten more in the same category. He worked on more than 160 films between 1963 and 2004. Portman later taught at Florida State University; he died of complications after a fall.

== Selected filmography ==
Portman won an Academy Award and was nominated for ten more:

Won

- The Deer Hunter (1978)

Nominated

- Kotch (1971)
- The Godfather (1972)
- The Candidate (1972)
- Paper Moon (1973)
- The Day of the Dolphin (1973)
- Young Frankenstein (1974)
- Funny Lady (1975)
- Coal Miner's Daughter (1980)
- On Golden Pond (1981)
- The River (1984)
