= Les Fresholtz =

American sound engineer (1931–2021)

- Born: December 21, 1931
- Died: March 2021 (aged 89)
- Occupation: Sound engineer
- Years active: 1968–1996

Lester Henry Fresholtz (December 21, 1931 – March 2021) was an American sound engineer. He won two Academy Awards for Best Sound and was nominated for ten more in the same category. He worked on more than 110 films between 1968 and 1996. He died in March 2021 at the age of 89.

== Selected filmography ==
Fresholtz won two Academy Awards and was nominated for another ten:

Won

- All the President's Men (1976)
- Bird (1988)

Nominated

- Marooned (1969)
- Paper Moon (1973)
- Bite the Bullet (1975)
- The Electric Horseman (1979)
- Altered States (1980)
- Tootsie (1982)
- Ladyhawke (1985)
- Heartbreak Ridge (1986)
- Lethal Weapon (1987)
- Unforgiven (1992)
