= List of TV Guide covers (1980s) =

This is a list of issue covers of TV Guide magazine from the decade of the 1980s, from January 1980 to December 1989. The entries on this table include each cover's subjects and their artists (photographer or illustrator). This list is for the regular weekly issues of TV Guide; any one-time-only special issues are not included.

== 1980 ==
Issue date	Cover subject	Type of cover	Artist
1980-01-05	Jamie Farr, Loretta Swit & Alan Alda of M*A*S*H	Illustration	Ronald Searle
1980-01-12	Erik Estrada & Larry Wilcox of CHiPs	Photograph	Scott Enyart
1980-01-19	"Super Bowl '80"	Illustration	Nick Fasciano
1980-01-26	Richard Mulligan & Cathryn Damon of Soap	Illustration	Charles Santore
1980-02-02	Conrad Bain, Todd Bridges & Gary Coleman of Diff'rent Strokes	Photograph	Gene Trindl
1980-02-09	Olympics preview	Illustration	Wilson McLean
1980-02-16	Buddy Ebsen & Lee Meriwether of Barnaby Jones	Illustration	John Thompson
1980-02-23	"Selecting Our Leaders: The TV Drama Begins"	Illustration	George Giusti
1980-03-01	Hervé Villechaize & Ricardo Montalbán of Fantasy Island	Illustration	Al Hirschfeld
1980-03-08	Mary Crosby, Larry Hagman & Linda Gray of Dallas	Photograph	Peter Kredenser
1980-03-15	The cast of Family	Photograph	Ken Whitmore
1980-03-22	Claude Akins, Brian Kerwin & Mills Watson of The Misadventures of Sheriff Lobo	Illustration	Charles Santore
1980-03-29	Martin Balsam & Carroll O'Connor of Archie Bunker's Place	Illustration	Bernie Fuchs
1980-04-05	1980 Baseball season preview	Illustration	John Berkey
1980-04-12	Olivia Newton-John on the week of her ABC Special	Photograph	Herb Ritts
1980-04-19	Linda Lavin, Vic Tayback, Beth Howland & Diane Ladd of Alice	Photograph	Larry Dale Gordon
1980-04-26	Beau Bridges & Helen Shaver of United States	Photograph	Peter Kredenser
1980-05-03	Robin Williams & Pam Dawber of Mork & Mindy	Illustration	Bob Peak
1980-05-10	Mackenzie Phillips, Bonnie Franklin & Valerie Bertinelli of One Day at a Time	Illustration	Richard Amsel
1980-05-17	Franklin Cover, Isabel Sanford, Roxie Roker & Sherman Hemsley of The Jeffersons	Photograph	Ken Whitmore
1980-05-24	"Situation Comedies: Are They Getting Better--or Worse?" *first issue with year on the cover	Illustration	Don Weller
1980-05-31	Bart Braverman, Greg Morris, Robert Urich & Phyllis Davis of Vega$	Illustration	Wilson McLean
1980-06-07	Joan Van Ark & Ted Shackelford of Knots Landing	Photograph	Robert Phillips
1980-06-14	Lynn Redgrave of House Calls	Photograph	Jim Britt
1980-06-21	Robert Wagner & Stefanie Powers of Hart to Hart	Illustration	Richard Amsel
1980-06-28	Gregory Harrison & Pernell Roberts of Trapper John, M.D.	Photograph	Robert Phillips
1980-07-05	The cast of Little House on the Prairie	Illustration	Teresa Fasolino
1980-07-12	John Schneider, Catherine Bach & Tom Wopat of The Dukes of Hazzard	Illustration	John Thompson
1980-07-19	Lauren Tewes, Gavin MacLeod & Ted Lange of The Love Boat	Illustration	Raymond Ameijide
1980-07-26	Judd Hirsch, Marilu Henner & Tony Danza of Taxi	Illustration	Bob Peak
1980-08-02	Sarah Purcell of Real People	Photograph	George Schlatter Productions
1980-08-09	"Children's Television: Experts Pick the Best—and Worst—Shows"	Photograph	Charles Santore
1980-08-16	"TV's Incredible Hunks", featuring Tom Wopat of The Dukes of Hazzard, Erik Estrada of CHiPs & Greg Evigan of B. J. and the Bear	Photograph	Jim Britt
1980-08-23	Genie Francis of General Hospital	Photograph	Peter Kredenser
1980-08-30	Football Preview	Illustration	Wilson McLean
1980-09-06	Richard Chamberlain of Shōgun	Illustration	Richard Amsel
1980-09-13	"Fall Preview"	Word art	Barry Zaid
1980-09-20	Priscilla Presley of Those Amazing Animals	Photograph	Peter Kredenser
1980-09-27	A preview of Cosmos	Illustration	courtesy KCET
1980-10-04	Ed Asner & Mason Adams of Lou Grant	Photograph	Ken Whitmore
1980-10-11	World Series	Illustration	Don Weller
1980-10-18	Sophia Loren of Sophia Loren: Her Own Story	Photograph	Tazio Secchiaroli
1980-10-25	James Gregory & Hal Linden of Barney Miller	Illustration	Al Hirschfeld
1980-11-01	"Election Preview," featuring presidential candidates John Anderson, Ronald Reagan & Jimmy Carter	Illustration	Jim Sharpe
1980-11-08	Polly Holliday of Flo	Photograph	Bob Peak
1980-11-15	Larry Hagman of Dallas	Photograph	Gene Trindl
1980-11-22	Pam Dawber of Mork & Mindy	Photograph	Robert Phillips
1980-11-29	Don Meredith, Howard Cosell, Fran Tarkenton & Frank Gifford of Monday Night Football	Illustration	Jack Davis
1980-12-06	Todd Bridges & Gary Coleman of Diff'rent Strokes	Photograph	Gene Trindl
1980-12-13	Diana Canova of I'm a Big Girl Now	Photograph	Robert Phillips
1980-12-20	Christmas	Illustration	John Alcorn
1980-12-27	Tom Selleck of Magnum, P.I.	Photograph	Robert Phillips

== 1981 ==
Issue date	Cover subject	Type of cover	Artist
1981-01-03	Deborah Van Valkenburgh, Ted Knight & Lydia Cornell of Too Close for Comfort	Photograph	Jim Britt
1981-01-10	David Hartman of Good Morning America	Photograph	Robert Barclay
1981-01-17	The Presidential Inauguration of Ronald Reagan	Illustration	Bob Peak
1981-01-24	"Super Bowl '81: The Inside Story"	Illustration	Brad Holland
1981-01-31	Bob Hope, Johnny Carson & George Burns of A Love Letter to Jack Benny	Photograph-Illustration	Gene Trindl; background illustration of Jack Benny is by René Bouché
1981-02-07	Jane Seymour of East of Eden	Photograph	Peter Kredenser
1981-02-14	The cast of WKRP in Cincinnati	Illustration	Jack Davis
1981-02-21	Faye Dunaway of Evita Peron	Photograph	Terry O'Neill
1981-02-28	"Hollywood's Cocaine Connection"	Illustration	Milton Glaser
1981-03-07	Tom Wopat, John Schneider, Sorrell Booke & Catherine Bach of The Dukes of Hazzard	Photograph	Jim Britt
1981-03-14	Suzanne Somers	Photograph	Jim Britt
1981-03-21	Wayne Rogers & Lynn Redgrave of House Calls	Photograph	Jim Britt
1981-03-28	Johnny Carson of The Tonight Show	Illustration	Richard Amsel
1981-04-04	Baseball Preview	Illustration	David Wilcox
1981-04-11	Ed Asner of Lou Grant	Photograph	Gene Trindl
1981-04-18	Ted Koppel of ABC News	Photograph	David Hume Kennerly
1981-04-25	Alan Alda of M*A*S*H	Illustration	Al Hirschfeld
1981-05-02	John Davidson, Cathy Lee Crosby & Fran Tarkenton of That's Incredible!	Photograph	Robert Peak
1981-05-09	Patrick Duffy & Larry Hagman of Dallas	Illustration	Charles Santore
1981-05-16	Robert Wagner, Stefanie Powers & Lionel Stander of Hart to Hart	Photograph	Peter Kredenser
1981-05-23	Barbara Eden of Harper Valley P.T.A.	Photograph	Robert Phillips
1981-05-30	Dan Rather of The CBS Evening News	Illustration	Bernie Fuchs
1981-06-06	Judd Hirsch and Andy Kaufman of Taxi	Photograph	Gene Trindl
1981-06-13	Pernell Roberts, Charles Siebert and Gregory Harrison of Trapper John, M.D.	Illustration	Wilson McLean
1981-06-20	John Barbour, Skip Stephenson, Bill Rafferty, Byron Allen and Sarah Purcell of Real People *last stapled issue*	Photograph	Gene Trindl
1981-06-27	Linda Evans of Dynasty	Photograph	Mario Casilli
1981-07-04	Dana Plato and Gary Coleman of Diff'rent Strokes	Photograph	Gene Trindl
1981-07-11	"Prime-Time Vixens", featuring Donna Mills of Knots Landing, Morgan Fairchild of Flamingo Road and Pamela Sue Martin of Dynasty	Photograph	Peter Kredenser
1981-07-18	Greg Evigan, Judy Landers and Bear of B. J. and the Bear	Photograph	Jim Britt
1981-07-25	The wedding of Prince Charles and Lady Diana Spencer	Illustration	Richard Amsel
1981-08-01	Miss Piggy	Photograph	John E. Barrett
1981-08-08	Carroll O'Connor of Archie Bunker's Place	Illustration	Richard Hess
1981-08-15	"How TV Reacted the Day Elvis Died: A Classic Study of News Judgment"	Illustration	Bob Peak
1981-08-22	Ann Jillian of It's a Living	Photograph	Jim Britt
1981-08-29	Pro Football '81	Illustration	Bernie Fuchs
1981-09-05	Backstage with Miss America	Illustration	Don Weller
1981-09-12	Fall Preview: Special Issue	illustration	Ivan Chermayeff
1981-09-19	Kate Mulgrew as Rachel Manion of The Manions of America	Illustration	Richard Amsel
1981-09-26	"The Battle for Northern Ireland: How TV Tips the Balance"	Photograph	Campion - Gamma/Liaison
1981-10-03	Valerie Bertinelli of One Day at a Time	Photograph	Peter Kredenser
1981-10-10	Jaclyn Smith of Jacqueline Bouvier Kennedy	Photograph	Robert Phillips
1981-10-17	"Secrets of Successful World Series Pitching"	Illustration	Walt Spitzmiller
1981-10-24	"Blind Spot in Middle East"	Illustration	Robert Giusti
1981-10-31	Bruce Weitz, Daniel J. Travanti and Michael Conrad of Hill Street Blues	Photograph	Rober Phillips
1981-11-07	Mimi Kennedy and Peter Cook of The Two of Us	Photograph	Robert Phillips
1981-11-14	Loretta Lynn	Photograph	Robert Phillips
1981-11-21	"TV and the John Lennon Tragedy: One Year Later"	Illustration	Richard Hess
1981-11-28	Merlin Olsen of Father Murphy	Photograph	Robert Phillips
1981-12-05	Lorna Patterson of Private Benjamin	Photograph	Ken Whitmore
1981-12-12	A Shopper's Guide to 1981's Best Video Games	Illustration	Jerry Allen
1981-12-19	Christmas 1981	Illustration	Raymond Ameijide
1981-12-26	Henry Fonda	Photograph	Mary Ellen Mark

== 1982 ==
Issue date	Cover subject	Type of cover	Artist
1982-01-02	John Hillerman and Tom Selleck of Magnum, P.I.	Photograph	Gene Trindl
1982-01-09	Michael Landon of Little House on the Prairie	Illustration	Richard Hess
1982-01-16	"Bending the Rules in Hollywood: How TV's Movers and Shakers Operate"	Word art	
1982-01-23	"How Brains Win the Super Bowl"	Illustration	Jim Sharpe
1982-01-30	Robert Pine, Larry Wilcox and Erik Estrada of CHiPs	Illustration	Wilson McLean
1982-02-06	Sherman Hemsley of The Jeffersons	Illustration	Bernie Fuchs
1982-02-13	A review of TV depictions of the Holocaust	Illustration	Bob Peak
1982-02-20	Ed Bradley, Morley Safer, Mike Wallace and Harry Reasoner of 60 Minutes	Illustration	Richard Anderson
1982-02-27	Pamela Sue Martin, John Forsythe and Linda Evans of Dynasty	Photograph	Robert Phillips
1982-03-06	Swoosie Kurtz, Tony Randall and Kaleena Kiff of Love, Sydney	Photograph	Robert Phillips
1982-03-13	Priscilla Barnes, John Ritter and Joyce DeWitt of Three's Company	Photograph	Mario Casilli
1982-03-20	President Ronald Reagan	Photograph	Dennis Brack/Black Star
1982-03-27	Larry Hagman of Dallas	Photograph	Douglas W. Dubler
1982-04-03	Baseball '82	Illustration	C. Michael Dudash
1982-04-10	Tom Brokaw of NBC Nightly News	Photograph	Robert Phillips
1982-04-17	Scott Baio, Henry Winkler and Erin Moran of Happy Days	Photograph	Jim Britt
1982-04-24	Ingrid Bergman as Golda Meir of A Woman Called Golda	Illustration	Richard Amsel
1982-05-01	John Schneider, Catherine Bach and Tom Wopat of The Dukes of Hazzard	Illustration	Richard Anderson
1982-05-08	Goldie Hawn	Photograph	Mario Casilli
1982-05-15	Ken Marshall in Marco Polo	Illustration	Richard Hess
1982-05-22	Billy Moses, Lorenzo Lamas and Jane Wyman of Falcon Crest	Photograph	Peter Kredenser
1982-05-29	"Anatomy of a Smear", featuring Mike Wallace and George Crile III of CBS News and Gen. William Westmoreland	Photo montage	Richard Newton
1982-06-05	Lauren Tewes and Gavin MacLeod of The Love Boat	Illustration	Bernie Fuchs
1982-06-12	"Why American TV Is So Vulnerable to Foreign Disinformation"	Illustration	Richard Newton
1982-06-19	Daniel J. Travanti and Veronica Hamel of Hill Street Blues	Photograph	Gene Trindl
1982-06-26	Michele Lee of Knots Landing	Photograph	Mario Casilli
1982-07-03	Ted Knight, Lydia Cornell and Deborah Van Valkenburgh of Too Close for Comfort	Illustration	Richard Amsel
1982-07-10	Nancy McKeon, Charlotte Rae, Lisa Whelchel, Kim Fields and Mindy Cohn of The Facts of Life	Photograph	Peter Kredenser
1982-07-17	Rick Springfield of General Hospital	Photograph	Mario Casilli
1982-07-24	William Katt of The Greatest American Hero	Illustration	Richard Newton
1982-07-31	Katherine Cannon and Merlin Olsen of Father Murphy	Photograph	Gene Trindl
1982-08-07	Carroll O'Connor and Denise Miller of Archie Bunker's Place	Photograph	Mario Casilli
1982-08-14	William Shatner of T. J. Hooker	Photograph	Gene Trindl
1982-08-21	Nell Carter and Dolph Sweet of Gimme a Break!	Illustration	C. Michael Dudash
1982-08-28	Penny Marshall and Cindy Williams of Laverne & Shirley	Photograph	Peter Kredenser
1982-09-04	Almost Miss America '82	Illustration	James Mathemuse
1982-09-11	Fall Preview '82	illustration	uncredited
1982-09-18	Victoria Principal of Dallas	Photograph	Robert Phillips
1982-09-25	"How Americans Rate TV Newspeople," featuring Harry Reasoner of 60 Minutes, David Brinkley of This Week and John Chancellor of NBC News	Photo montage	Art by Richard Newton
1982-10-02	Genie Francis of General Hospital	Photograph	Peter Kredenser
1982-10-09	World Series '82	Illustration	Bernie Fuchs
1982-10-16	Erik Estrada and Morgan Fairchild in Honey Boy	Photograph	Peter Kredenser
1982-10-23	Linda Evans and Joan Collins of Dynasty	Photograph	Mario Casilli
1982-10-30	Pernell Roberts of Trapper John, M.D.	illustration	Bernard Fuchs
1982-11-06	Gene Anthony Ray and Erica Gimpel of Fame	Photograph	Mario Casilli
1982-11-13	A profile of The Blue and the Gray	Illustration	Kinuko Y. Craft
1982-11-20	Richard Kline, Joyce DeWitt, John Ritter and Priscilla Barnes of Three's Company	Illustration	Joseph Cellini
1982-11-27	Meredith Baxter Birney of Family Ties	Photograph	Mario Casilli
1982-12-04	A Shopper's Guide to 1982's Best Video games	illustration	uncredited
1982-12-11	Sally Struthers of Gloria with daughter Samantha	Photograph	Peter Kredenser
1982-12-18	Deborah Van Valkenburgh, Ted Knight, Michael Phillip, William Thomas Cannon, Nancy Dussault and Lydia Cornell of Too Close for Comfort	Photograph	Jim Britt
1982-12-25	Christmas 1982	Illustration	Teresa Fasolino

== 1983 ==
Issue date	Cover subject	Type of cover	Artist
1983-01-01	Bob Newhart and Mary Frann of Newhart	Photograph	Mario Casilli
1983-01-08	John Madden of CBS Sports	Photograph	Christopher Little
1983-01-15	Rita Moreno, Valerie Curtin, Rachel Dennison, Jean Marsh and Peter Bonerz of 9 to 5	Photograph	Mario Casilli
1983-01-22	"Rating TV's Investigative Reporters", featuring Mike Wallace of 60 Minutes, Geraldo Rivera of 20-20 and Brian Ross of NBC Nightly News	Photo montage	CBS; NBC; Ken Regan/Camera 5
1983-01-29	Robert Mitchum and Ali MacGraw in The Winds of War	Illustration	Richard Hess
1983-02-05	Cheryl Ladd as Grace Kelly	Illustration	Richard Amsel
1983-02-12	A salute to M*A*S*H (fold-out cover)	Photograph	Sherman Weisburd; Curt Gunther; Mario Casilli
1983-02-19	Armand Assante, Jaclyn Smith and Ken Howard in Rage of Angels	Photograph	
1983-02-26	Kim Delaney, Laurence Lau and Susan Lucci of All My Children	Photograph	Robert Phillips
1983-03-05	Valerie Bertinelli of One Day at a Time	Photograph	Mario Casilli
1983-03-12	Bruce Weitz of Hill Street Blues	Illustration	Richard Hess
1983-03-19	Gary Coleman of Diff'rent Strokes with First Lady Nancy Reagan	Photograph	Robert Phillips
1983-03-26	Richard Chamberlain and Rachel Ward of The Thorn Birds	Photograph	Dennis Piel/ABC
1983-04-02	Donna Mills of Knots Landing	Photograph	Mario Casilli
1983-04-09	Elvis Presley	Illustration	Richard Amsel
1983-04-16	How Good is 60 Minutes Now: Ed Bradley, Mike Wallace, Harry Reasoner and Morley Safer	Illustration	Richard Hess
1983-04-23	Linda Purl and Henry Winkler of Happy Days	Photograph	Jim Britt
1983-04-30	Tom Selleck	Illustration	Richard Amsel
1983-05-07	Erin Gray, Ricky Schroder and Joel Higgins of Silver Spoons	Photograph	John Cahoon
1983-05-14	Kathleen Beller and John James of Dynasty	Photograph	Mario Casilli
1983-05-21	Bob Hope, on the week of his 80th birthday special	Illustration	Richard Amsel
1983-05-28	Audrey Landers, Ken Kercheval and Larry Hagman of Dallas	Photograph; Photograph	Peter Kredenser; Gene Trindl
1983-06-04	Heather Thomas, Doug Barr and Lee Majors of The Fall Guy	Illustration	C. Michael Dudash
1983-06-11	A survey of casting directors on the acting abilities of TV's top performers, featuring Valerie Bertinelli, Alan Alda, Erik Estrada and Linda Evans	Photo montage	Mario Casilli, Jim Britt, Gene Trindl
1983-06-18	Jameson Parker and Gerald McRaney of Simon & Simon	Photograph	Gene Trindl
1983-06-25	David Hasselhoff of Knight Rider, sitting inside KITT's drivers seat	Photograph	Robert Phillips
1983-07-02	"The Best and Worst We Saw"	Photo montage	
1983-07-09	Ana Alicia, Jane Wyman and Lorenzo Lamas of Falcon Crest	Photograph	Mario Casilli
1983-07-16	"TV's Hunks — Isn't Something Missing?" featuring Tom Selleck, Lee Horsley, Pierce Brosnan and Gregory Harrison	Photo montage	Robert Phillips Gene Trindl
1983-07-23	Ted Shackelford, Joan Van Ark and Donna Mills of Knots Landing	Photograph	Peter Kredenser
1983-07-30	Isabel Sanford and Sherman Hemsley of The Jeffersons	Photograph	Gene Trindl
1983-08-06	"Why There Are Still No Female Dan Rathers", featuring Judy Woodruff, Lesley Stahl and Anne Garrels	Photograph	Robert Phillips
1983-08-13	Deidre Hall and Wayne Northrop of Days of Our Lives	Photograph	Mario Cassilli
1983-08-20	Robert Wagner and Stefanie Powers of Hart to Hart	Photograph	Robert Phillips
1983-08-27	"Who's Toughest on the White House—And Why"	Word art	John Berkey
1983-09-03	A farewell salute to All in the Family, featuring Rob Reiner, Jean Stapleton, Carroll O'Connor and Sally Struthers patterned after the 1971-05-29 cover	Illustration	Richard Amsel
1983-09-10	"Fall Preview," featuring the casts of AfterMASH, Hotel and Mr. Smith	Photo montage	Mario Casilli
1983-09-17	Miss America 1983	Photograph	Al Levine/NBC
1983-09-24	Joyce DeWitt, John Ritter and Priscilla Barnes of Three's Company	Illustration	Richard Amsel
1983-10-01	Gregory Harrison of Trapper John, M.D.	Photograph	Mario Casilli
1983-10-08	Willie Nelson and Anne Murray, co-hosts of the Country Music Association Awards	Photograph	Robert Phillips
1983-10-15	Larry Hagman of Dallas and Joan Collins of Dynasty	Photograph	Peter Kredenser/Gamma-Liaison; Dick Zimmerman/ABC
1983-10-22	The title character of Mr. Smith	Photograph	Mario Casilli
1983-10-29	James Brolin and Connie Sellecca of Hotel	Photograph	Mario Casilli
1983-11-05	Merete Van Kamp of Princess Daisy	Photograph	Mario Casilli
1983-11-12	John F. Kennedy and Jacqueline Kennedy	Illustration	Richard Amsel
1983-11-19	Doug Scott and John Cullum in The Day After	Photo montage	Dean Williams/ABC
1983-11-26	Linda Evans and Kenny Rogers of Gambler II	Photograph	Mario Casilli
1983-12-03	Barbara Walters with interview subject Johnny Carson	Photograph	Gary Null / NBC
1983-12-10	Tom Selleck of Magnum, P.I.	Illustration	Richard Hess
1983-12-17	Erin Gray of Silver Spoons	Photograph	Jim Britt
1983-12-24	Gavin MacLeod, Lauren Tewes, Jill Whelan, Ted Lange, Fred Grandy and Bernie Kopell of The Love Boat	Illustration	Bruce Stark
1983-12-31	Farrah Fawcett	Photograph	Mario Casilli

== 1984 ==
Issue date	Cover subject	Type of cover	Artist
1984-01-07	William Christopher, Harry Morgan, Rosalind Chao and Jamie Farr of After M*A*S*H	Photograph	Mario Casilli
1984-01-14	Emmanuel Lewis of Webster	Photograph	Ken Whitmore
1984-01-21	Game show hosts Pat Sajak, Monty Hall, Bob Barker, Jack Barry, Bill Cullen and Wink Martindale	Photograph	Mario Casilli
1984-01-28	Cybill Shepherd of The Yellow Rose	Photograph	Peter Kredenser
1984-02-04	1984 Winter Olympics	Photo montage	Focus on Sports
1984-02-11	Kate Jackson and Bruce Boxleitner of Scarecrow and Mrs. King	Photograph	Mario Casilli
1984-02-18	Ted Danson, Shelley Long and Rhea Perlman of Cheers	Photograph	Mario Casilli
1984-02-25	Harry Reasoner, Ed Bradley, Mike Wallace and Morley Safer of 60 Minutes	Photograph	Robert Phillips
1984-03-03	Ann-Margret and Treat Williams in A Streetcar Named Desire	Photograph	Mario Casilli
1984-03-10	George Peppard, Dwight Schultz, Dirk Benedict and Mr. T. of The A-Team	Photograph	Mario Casilli
1984-03-17	Priscilla Presley of Dallas	Photograph	Mario Casilli
1984-03-24	Veronica Hamel and Daniel J. Travanti of Hill Street Blues	Photograph	Jim Britt
1984-03-31	Teri Copley of We Got It Made	Photograph	Jim Cornfield
1984-04-07	Mike Wallace of 60 Minutes and Barry Bostwick as George Washington	Photograph	Mario Casilli
1984-04-14	Rebecca Holden and David Hasselhoff of Knight Rider	Photograph	Mario Casilli
1984-04-21	Ben Cross and Amy Irving of The Far Pavilions	Illustration	Richard Amsel
1984-04-28	Members of the Cast of Happy Days: Tom Bosley, Henry Winkler, Ron Howard, Scott Baio, Marion Ross, Anson Williams, Donny Most, Pat Morita, Al Molinaro, Lynda Goodfriend and Cathy Silvers	Photograph	Mario Casilli
1984-05-05	Lesley-Anne Down in The Last Days of Pompeii	Illustration	C. Michael Dudash
1984-05-12	Crystal Gayle, co-host of the Academy of Country Music Awards	Photograph	Harry Langdon
1984-05-19	Morgan Fairchild as Maid Marian of The Zany Adventures of Robin Hood	Photograph	Robert Phillips
1984-05-26	Daniel Hugh Kelly and Brian Keith of Hardcastle and McCormick	Illustration	Jim Sharpe
1984-06-02	Victoria Principal of Dallas	Photograph	Peter Kredenser
1984-06-09	Pierce Brosnan and Stephanie Zimbalist of Remington Steele	Photograph	Mark Sennett
1984-06-16	A Social Climbers' Guide to TV: Larry Hagman, Stefanie Powers and Joan Collins	Illustration	Bruce Stark
1984-06-23	Connie Sellecca of Hotel	Photograph	Mario Casilli
1984-06-30	"The Best and Worst We Saw"	Photo montage	uncredited
1984-07-07	Valerie Bertinelli of One Day at a Time	Photograph	Mario Casilli
1984-07-14	Johnny Carson	Photo montage	Joan Hall
1984-07-21	Donna Mills, Ted Shackelford and Lisa Hartman of Knots Landing	Photograph	Mario Casilli
1984-07-28	Summer Olympics '84	Illustration	Bernie Fuchs
1984-08-04	Jameson Parker and Gerald McRaney of Simon & Simon	Photograph	Mario Casilli
1984-08-11	Members of the cast of Call to Glory	Illustration	Jim Sharpe
1984-08-18	Jane Pauley of Today	Photograph	Henry Wolf
1984-08-25	Lindsay Bloom and Stacy Keach of Mickey Spillane's Mike Hammer	Photograph	Mario Casilli
1984-09-01	60 Minutes Solves This Year's Dallas Mystery: Who Shot Bobby? Linda Gray, Larry Hagman, Victoria Principal, Patrick Duffy with Morley Safer	Illustration	Ann Meisel
1984-09-08	Fall Preview	Illustration	Bernard Bonhomme
1984-09-15	"George Burns Tells How to Live to Be 100—or More," featuring Burns with Catherine Bach	Photograph	Greg Gorman
1984-09-22	Philippine Leroy Beaulieu and Stacy Keach in Mistral's Daughter	Photograph	Bob Greene
1984-09-29	Mary Tyler Moore and James Garner of Heart Sounds	Illustration	Richard Amsel
1984-10-06	Nicollette Sheridan, Terry Farrell and Morgan Fairchild of Paper Dolls	Photograph	Mario Casilli
1984-10-13	Keshia Knight Pulliam and Bill Cosby of The Cosby Show	Photograph	Mario Casilli
1984-10-20	Daniel J. Travanti, Sophia Loren and Edoardo Ponti in Aurora by Night	Photograph	Mario Casilli
1984-10-27	Brooke Shields in Wet Gold	Photograph	Jim Globus
1984-11-03	Tales of Election Drama	Illustration	Braldt Bralds
1984-11-10	Michael Nader and Joan Collins of Dynasty	Photograph	Mario Casilli
1984-11-17	"What's It Like to Be a Top TV Model", featuring Carol Alt, Kim Alexis and Kelly Emberg	Photograph	Roger Prigent
1984-11-24	Jane Curtin and Susan Saint James of Kate & Allie	Photograph	Mario Casilli
1984-12-01	Shari-Belafonte Harper of Hotel	Photograph	Mario Casilli
1984-12-08	Ana Alicia and Billy Moses of Falcon Crest	Photograph	Peter Kredenser
1984-12-15	Connie Sellecca, Priscilla Presley and Jaclyn Smith	Photo montage	Mario Casilli
1984-12-22	Susan Clark, Alex Karras and Emanuel Lewis of Webster	Photograph	Mario Casilli
1984-12-29	Larry Hagman and Linda Gray of Dallas	Photograph	Mario Casilli

== 1985 ==
Issue date	Cover subject	Type of cover	Artist
1985-01-05	"Why the Elvis Craze Won't Die"	Illustration	Michael Dudash
1985-01-12	William Devane and Donna Mills of Knots Landing	Photograph	Peter Kredenser
1985-01-19	Previews of the Presidential Inauguration and Super Bowl XIX	Illustration	Charles Santore
1985-01-26	Perry King of Riptide	Photograph	Jim Shea
1985-02-02	Sharon Gless and Tyne Daly of Cagney & Lacey	Illustration	Richard Amsel
1985-02-09	Ellen Foley and Harry Anderson of Night Court	Photograph	Tony Costa
1985-02-16	Candice Bergen, Joanna Cassidy, Mary Crosby, Angie Dickinson, Stefanie Powers, Suzanne Somers, Catherine Mary Stewart and Frances Bergen of Hollywood Wives	Photograph	Milton H. Greene
1985-02-23	A preview of The Grammys, featuring Bruce Springsteen, Prince and Michael Jackson	Illustration	John Solie
1985-03-02	Michael Landon of Highway to Heaven	Photograph	Mario Casilli
1985-03-09	Angela Lansbury of Murder, She Wrote	Illustration	Richard Amsel (the signature on the cover is "Jarvis" for Dave Jarvis)
1985-03-16	Lauren Tewes and inset photo of Tewes and Gavin MacLeod	Photograph with inset Photograph	Jim Britt; inset photograph-Gene Trindl
1985-03-23	Diahann Carroll of Dynasty	Photograph	Mario Casilli
1985-03-30	Anthony Andrews, Ava Gardner, Jack Warden, James Mason, Richard Kiley and John McEnery of A.D.	Illustration	Richard Hess
1985-04-06	Richard Chamberlain of Wallenberg: A Hero's Story	Photograph	Frank Carroll
1985-04-13	Blair Brown, James Garner and Harry Hamlin of Space	Illustration	John Solie
1985-04-20	Deborah Shelton of Dallas	Photograph	Peter Kredenser
1985-04-27	Tina Yothers, Michael J. Fox, Justine Bateman, Meredith Baxter Birney and Michael Gross of Family Ties	Photograph	Jim Shea
1985-05-04	Phoebe Cates of Lace II	Illustration	Roger Prigent
1985-05-11	Cheryl Ladd of A Death in California	Photograph	Mario Casilli
1985-05-18	Gabriel Byrne of Christopher Columbus	Illustration	Bralt Bralds
1985-05-25	Antony Hamilton and Jennifer O'Neill of Cover Up	Photograph	Mario Casilli
1985-06-01	Members of the cast of Hill Street Blues	Illustration	Bruce Stark
1985-06-08	Jameson Parker and Gerald McRaney of Simon & Simon	Illustration	Bob Peak
1985-06-15	"Surprise! Has TV Got a Summer for You!" featuring Mary Lou Retton, Roger Mudd, Connie Chung, Teri Copley and Robert Redford	Photo montage	Ken Regan; Art Stein; Tri-Star Pictures; Robert Nese; Shelly Roseman
1985-06-22	First Lady Nancy Reagan	Illustration	Richard Amsel
1985-06-29	"The Best and Worst We Saw"	Photo montage	Mario Casilli; Ron Tom; Bob D'Amico
1985-07-06	Ted Danson, Shelley Long and George Wendt of Cheers	Photograph	Jim Shea
1985-07-13	Heather Thomas of The Fall Guy	Photograph	Peter Kredenser
1985-07-20	"TV's Hottest Soap Couples," featuring Kristina Malandro & Jack Wagner of General Hospital, Stephanie E. Williams & Phil Morris of The Young and the Restless and Kristian Alfonso & Peter Reckell of Days of Our Lives	Photo montage	Jim Britt
1985-07-27	Philip Michael Thomas and Don Johnson of Miami Vice	Illustration	Richard Amsel
1985-08-03	"Romance on the Set," featuring Catherine Hickland and David Hasselhoff	Word art-illustration	Gene Trindl photo
1985-08-10	Madonna from the video for Material Girl	Illustration	Bob Peak
1985-08-17	"Real Men and the Wimps on TV," featuring Bill Cosby, Tom Selleck, Bob Newhart, Lee Majors, Mr. T and Ted Danson	Illustration	Bruce Stark
1985-08-24	Lisa Hartman and Alec Baldwin of Knots Landing	Photograph	
1985-08-31	George Peppard and Mr. T of The A-Team	Illustration	Mark Hess
1985-09-07	Phylicia Ayers-Allen and Bill Cosby of The Cosby Show	Photograph	
1985-09-14	Fall Preview	Illustration	Michael Foreman
1985-09-21	Michael J. Fox of Family Ties	Photograph	Peter Kredenser
1985-09-28	Howard Cosell of ABC Sports with Frank Gifford, Don Meredith and O. J. Simpson	Photo montage & Illustration	Charles Santore (illustration of Howard Cosell)
1985-10-05	Cybill Shepherd and Don Johnson of The Long Hot Summer	Photograph	
1985-10-12	Victoria Principal of Dallas	Photograph	Peter Kredenser
1985-10-19	Betty White, Rue McClanahan and Bea Arthur of The Golden Girls	Photograph	Herb Ball
1985-10-26	News anchors Tom Brokaw, Peter Jennings and Dan Rather	Illustration	Richard Amsel
1985-11-02	Patrick Swayze, Wendy Kilbourne, James Read and Lesley-Anne Down of North and South	Photograph	
1985-11-09	Prince Charles and Diana, Princess of Wales	Photograph	Lord Snowdon
1985-11-16	Charlton Heston, Stephanie Beacham, Barbara Stanwyck, Emma Samms and John James of The Colbys	Photograph	
1985-11-23	Judith Light, Tony Danza and Katherine Helmond of Who's the Boss?	Photograph	
1985-11-30	"Is Knots Landing now better than Dallas and Dynasty?"	Illustration	Bruce Stark
1985-12-07	Cybill Shepherd of Moonlighting	Photograph	
1985-12-14	Robert Blake of Hell Town	Photograph	
1985-12-21	Victor French and Michael Landon of Highway to Heaven	Illustration	Richard Williams
1985-12-28	John Rubinstein, Penny Peyser and Jack Warden of Crazy Like a Fox	Photograph	

== 1986 ==
Issue date	Cover subject	Type of cover	Artist
1986-01-04	Connie Sellecca of Hotel	Photograph	Peter Kredenser
1986-01-11	Bruce Boxleitner and Kate Jackson of Scarecrow and Mrs. King	Illustration	John Solie
1986-01-18	John Larroquette, Harry Anderson and Markie Post of Night Court	Photograph	Tony Costa
1986-01-25	Joan Collins in Sins	Photograph	
1986-02-01	Maximilian Schell as Peter the Great	Illustration	Braldt Bralds
1986-02-08	Victoria Principal and Patrick Duffy of Dallas, Linda Evans and Rock Hudson of Dynasty and Lorenzo Lamas and Laura Johnson of Falcon Crest	Photo montage	
1986-02-15	Angela Lansbury of Murder, She Wrote	Photograph	
1986-02-22	Jane Seymour, Lee Horsley and Cheryl Ladd of Crossings	Photograph	Mario Casilli
1986-03-01	Linda Evans of Dynasty	Photograph	
1986-03-08	Don Johnson and Philip Michael Thomas of Miami Vice	Photograph	
1986-03-15	Madolyn Smith of If Tomorrow Comes	Photo montage	
1986-03-22	Bill Cosby	Illustration	Braldt Bralds
1986-03-29	Sexual Harassment in Hollywood	Illustration	Ivan Chermayeff
1986-04-05	Justine Bateman, Tina Yothers and Michael J. Fox of Family Ties	Photograph	
1986-04-12	Alice Krige and Richard Chamberlain of Dream West	Photograph	
1986-04-19	The 10 Most Attractive Men on TV, Pierce Brosnan, Tom Selleck and Don Johnson	Photo montage	
1986-04-26	Jane Curtin and Susan Saint James of Kate & Allie	Photograph	
1986-05-03	Mark Harmon of The Deliberate Stranger, James Read and Patrick Swayze of North and South, Book II	Photo montage	
1986-05-10	Members of the cast of Cheers	Illustration	Bruce Stark
1986-05-17	Burt Lancaster of On Wings of Eagles	Illustration	Richard Hess
1986-05-24	Larry Hagman of Dallas	Photograph	Mario Casilli
1986-05-31	Richard Dean Anderson of MacGyver	Photograph	Mario Casilli
1986-06-07	The Most Talented Stars on TV: Bruce Willis, Sharon Gless, Michael J. Fox	Photograph	Peter Kredenser
1986-06-14	Emmanuel Lewis of Webster	Photograph	
1986-06-21	Teri Austin of Knots Landing	Photograph	Bernard Boudreau
1986-06-28	Ronald and Nancy Reagan discuss "What We've Learned About America from Our Years in the White House"	Photograph	
1986-07-05	The Goodwill Games	Illustration	Robert Giusti
1986-07-12	The Best and Worst We Saw	Photo montage	
1986-07-19	Robert Urich and Barbara Stock of Spenser: For Hire	Photograph	Mario Casilli
1986-07-26	TV's Top Moneymakers: Bill Cosby, Richard Chamberlain, Linda Evans and John Forsythe	Illustration	Bruce Stark
1986-08-02	Shelley Long and Ted Danson of Cheers and Bruce Willis and Cybill Shepherd of Moonlighting	Photo montage	
1986-08-09	Alan Thicke, Joanna Kerns, Jeremy Miller, Tracey Gold and Kirk Cameron of Growing Pains	Photograph	
1986-08-16	Suzanne Somers	Photograph	
1986-08-23	Valerie Harper of Valerie	Photograph	Peter Kredenser
1986-08-30	Patrick Duffy and Victoria Principal of Dallas	Illustration	Teresa Fasolino
1986-09-06	"Rites of Fall", featuring Susan Akin and Sharlene Wells of the Miss America pageant and the N.Y. Giants quarterback Phil Simms	Photo montage	
1986-09-13	Fall Preview (Special Issue)	Illustration	Milton Glaser
1986-09-20	George Washington: The Forging of a Nation	Illustration	Stan Smetkowski
1986-09-27	Bronson Pinchot and Mark Linn-Baker of Perfect Strangers	Photograph	
1986-10-04	Lucille Ball of Life With Lucy and Andy Griffith of Matlock	Photograph	
1986-10-11	Harry Hamlin, Jill Eikenberry and Corbin Bernsen of L.A. Law	Photograph	
1986-10-18	Michael J. Fox and Brian Bonsall of Family Ties	Photograph	
1986-10-25	Kim Novak of Falcon Crest	Photograph	
1986-11-1	Ken Howard and Jaclyn Smith of Rage of Angels: The Story Continues	Photograph	
1986-11-08	Joan Collins and George Hamilton in Monte Carlo	Photograph	
1986-11-15	Carol Burnett, Charles Grodin, Teri Garr, Valerie Mahaffey, Gregory Harrison, and Dabney Coleman of Fresno	Photograph	
1986-11-22	Farrah Fawcett of Nazi Hunter: The Beate Klarsfeld Story	Photo montage	
1986-11-29	Tom Mason and Shelley Hack of Jack and Mike	Photograph	
1986-12-06	Delta Burke of Designing Women	Photograph	
1986-12-13	James Garner and James Woods in Promise	Photograph	
1986-12-20	Deidre Hall, Chad Allen, Wilford Brimley, Keri Houlihan and Shannen Doherty of Our House	Photograph	
1986-12-27	Heather Locklear of Dynasty	Photograph	

== 1987 ==
Issue date	Cover subject	Type of cover	Artist
1987-01-03	Angela Lansbury of Murder, She Wrote	Illustration	C. Michael Dudash
1987-01-10	Ted Koppel of Nightline	Illustration	Bernie Fuchs
1987-01-17	Sherman Hemsley and Clifton Davis of Amen	Photograph	
1987-01-24	Nicollette Sheridan of Knots Landing	Photograph	
1987-01-31	Betty White, Rue McClanahan, Bea Arthur and Estelle Getty of The Golden Girls	Illustration	Ann Meisel
1987-02-07	Ann-Margret in The Two Mrs. Grenvilles	Photograph	
1987-02-14	Robert Urich and Kris Kristofferson of Amerika	Photo montage	
1987-02-21	Tom Selleck of Magnum P.I. with guest Frank Sinatra	Photograph	Gene Trindl
1987-02-28	Valerie Bertinelli in I'll Take Manhattan		
1987-03-07	Michael J. Fox and Justine Bateman of Family Ties	Illustration	John Solie
1987-03-14	Victoria Principal of Dallas	Photograph	Peter Kredenser
1987-03-21	Don Johnson and Philip Michael Thomas of Miami Vice	Illustration	Ann Meisel
1987-03-28	Kirk Cameron of Growing Pains	Photograph	
1987-04-04	Susan Dey and Harry Hamlin of L.A. Law	Photograph	
1987-04-11	Bob Newhart, Tom Poston, Mary Frann, Tony Papenfuss, William Sanderson, John Volstad, Julia Duffy and Peter Scolari of Newhart	Illustration	Bruce Stark
1987-04-18	Tony Danza of Who's the Boss?	Photograph	Tony Costa
1987-04-25	Fred Dryer and Stepfanie Kramer of Hunter	Photograph	
1987-05-02	Members of the Cast of Cheers	Illustration	John Solie
1987-05-09	Pam Dawber and Rebecca Schaeffer of My Sister Sam	Photograph	Tony Costa
1987-05-16	Brian Robbins, Khrystyne Haje, Howard Hesseman, Robin Givens, Dan Frischman, Dan Schneider of Head of the Class	Photograph	
1987-05-23	Edward Woodward of The Equalizer	Illustration	Richard Hess
1987-05-30	Cybill Shepherd of Moonlighting	Phortograph	Mario Casilli
1987-06-06	Grading TV's Child Stars: Keshia Knight Pulliam, Jason Bateman, Jeremy Miller	Photo montage	Tony Costa (Jason Bateman & Jeremy Miller); Alan Singer (Keshia Knight Pulliam)
1987-06-13	Al Waxman and Sharon Gless of Cagney & Lacey	Photograph	
1987-06-20	Markie Post of Night Court		
1987-06-27	The Best and Worst We Saw		
1987-07-04	Barbara Walters with Angela Lansbury, Patrick Duffy and Betty White		
1987-07-11	Tempestt Bledsoe and Malcolm-Jamal Warner of The Cosby Show		
1987-07-18	Kate Jackson, Victoria Principal, Oprah Winfrey	Photograph	Peter Kredenser (Victoria Principal & Kate Jackson); Harrison Jones (Ophra Winfrey)
1987-07-25	Blair Brown of The Days and Nights of Molly Dodd	Photograph	Robert Phillips
1987-08-01	Melody Thomas Scott, Eric Braeden, Eileen Davidson of The Young and the Restless	Photograph	Bernard Boudreau
1987-08-08	"Is TV Sex Getting Bolder?"	Text	no credit
1987-08-15	ALF	Illustration	John Eggert
1987-08-22	A report on TV's involvement in opening up the Soviet Bloc	Illustration	John Berkey
1987-08-29	Sherman Hemsley and Anna Maria Horsford of Amen	Photograph	Mario Casilli
1987-09-05	Terri Garber of Dynasty	Photograph	
1987-09-12	Fall Preview (Special Issue)	Text Illustration	Byrd/Beserra Studios (David Edward Byrd & Julio Beserra)
1987-09-19	Brooke Shields	Photograph	
1987-09-26	Michael Tucker and Jill Eikenberry in Assault and Matrimony	Photograph	
1987-10-03	Victoria Principal in Mistress		
1987-10-10	Michael J. Fox of Family Ties, Bob Newhart of Newhart, Joanna Kerns, Alan Thicke, Kirk Cameron of Growing Pains	Photo montage	Curt Gunther (Michael J. Fox); Tony Esparza (Bob Newhart); Fred Sabine (Alan Thicke, Kirk Cameron, Joanna Kerns)
1987-10-17	Dolly Parton of Dolly	Photograph	Mario Casilli
1987-10-24	Bruce Willis and Cybill Shepherd of Moonlighting	Photograph	Mario Casilli
1987-10-31	Courteney Cox and Michael J. Fox of Family Ties	Photograph	Tony Costa
1987-11-07	Jacqueline Bisset and Armand Assante in Napoleon and Josephine: A Love Story	Photograph	Jim Globus
1987-11-14	Ted Danson and Kirstie Alley of Cheers	Photograph	Tony Costa
1987-11-21	Linda Gray, Kenny Rogers and Bruce Boxleitner in Gambler III	Photograph	
1987-11-28	David Birney and Meredith Baxter Birney in Long Journey Home	Photograph	Robert Isenberg
1987-12-05	Connie Sellecca in Downpayment on Murder	Photograph	Mario Casilli
1987-12-12	John Ritter and "Bijoux" of Hooperman	Photograph	Annie Leibovitz
1987-12-19	Keshia Knight Pulliam in The Little Match Girl		
1987-12-26	Amanda Peterson, Trey Ames and Richard Kiley of A Year in the Life	Photograph	

== 1988 ==
Issue date	Cover subject	Type of cover	Artist
1988-01-02	Jane Wyman, Dana Sparks, Margaret Ladd, Ana Alicia and Susan Sullivan of Falcon Crest	Photograph	Mario Casilli
1988-01-09	Emma Samms of Dynasty	Photograph	Tony Costa
1988-01-16	Sharon Gless and Tyne Daly of Cagney & Lacey	Illustration	David Edward Byrd
1988-01-23	"How We Feel About TV's Role in Campaign '88"	Illustration	George Giusti
1988-01-30	Priscilla Beaulieu Presley and Elvis Presley	Photograph	Mario Casilli
1988-02-06	Jaclyn Smith and Robert Wagner in Windmills of the Gods	Photograph	
1988-02-13	The 1988 Winter Olympics	Illustration	David Edward Byrd
1988-02-20	Pierce Brosnan and Deborah Raffin in James Clavell's Noble House	Illustration	Max Ginsburg
1988-02-27	Cheryl Ladd of Bluegrass	Photograph	Mike Fuller
1988-03-05	Oprah Winfrey of The Oprah Winfrey Show	Photograph	
1988-03-12	Is TV Getting Better or Worse? Desi Arnaz and Lucille Ball, Kirstie Alley and Ted Danson; ALF, Max Wright, Anne Schedeen and Benji Gregory; David Ogden Stiers, Harry Morgan, Loretta Swit, Mike Farrell, Jamie Farr, Alan Alda and William Christopher	Photo montage	
1988-03-19	Philip Michael Thomas and Don Johnson of Miami Vice	Photograph	
1988-03-26	Sheree J. Wilson of Dallas	Photograph	Charles William Bush
1988-04-02	Kirk Cameron and Tracey Gold of Growing Pains	Illustration	Max Ginsburg
1988-04-09	Harry Hamlin of L.A. Law	Photograph	
1988-04-16	Tim Reid, Daphne Maxwell Reid of Frank's Place	Photograph	Mario Casilli
1988-04-23	Jason Bateman of Valerie's Family	Photograph	Tony Costa
1988-04-30	Dr. Ruth Westheimer with Beau Arthur, Betty White and Estelle Getty of The Golden Girls	Illustration	John Solie
1988-05-07	Richard Chamberlain and Jaclyn Smith in The Bourne Identity	Photograph	Sven Arnstein
1988-05-14	Lesley Stahl, Chris Wallace and Sam Donaldson	Photo montage	Donna Svennevik
1988-05-21	Princess Diana and Prince Charles	Illustration	David Edward Byrd
1988-05-28	Brian Bonsall and Michael J. Fox of Family Ties	Photograph	Bonnie Schiffman
1988-06-04	Stars and Strife at ABC Sports Carl Lewis and Donna de Varona, Howard Cosell and Al Michaels	Photo montage	Peter J. Sutton (Carl Lewis & Donna de Varona); Focus On Sports (Howard Coosell & Al Michaels)
1988-06-11	Mel Harris, Brittany Craven, and Ken Olin of thirtysomething	Photograph	Tony Costa
1988-06-18	The 1988 Network News All-Star Team: Peter Jennings, Tom Brokaw, Rita Braver, Bruce Morton, John McWethy	Illustration	John Solie
1988-06-25	The Best and Worst We Saw	Photo montage	
1988-07-02	Delta Burke, Annie Potts, Dixie Carter, Jean Smart of Designing Women	Photograph	Charles William Bush
1988-07-09	Brian Robbins, Khrystyne Haje, Howard Hesseman, Robin Givens, Dan Frischman, Dan Schneider of Head of the Class	Photograph	
1988-07-16	Kim Alexis and Nicollette Sheridan	Photograph	Francesco Scavullo
1988-07-23	"How TV is Shaking Up the American Family"	Illustration	Jean-Michel Folon
1988-07-30	Leann Hunley of Dynasty	Photograph	Mario Casilli
1988-08-06	Daytime Soaps: The Best and Brightest: Susan Lucci of All My Children, Peter Barton and Lauralee Bell of The Young and the Restless, Drake Hogestyn of Days of Our Lives, Tristan Rogers of General Hospital	Photo montage	Alice S. Hall (Drake Hogestyn); Ann Limoncello (Susan Lucci); Bob D'Amico (Tristan Rogers); Geraldine Overton (Lauralee Bell & Peter Barton)
1988-08-13	ALF	Photograph	
1988-08-20	Johnny Depp and Holly Robinson of 21 Jump Street	Photograph	
1988-08-27	Mariel Hemingway in Steal the Sky	Photograph	Bernard Boudreau
1988-09-03	The Best Thing You Can Do This Fall - A Survivor's Guide: Kaye Lani Rafko; Charlie Sheen in Platoon; Charlie Brown, Linus van Pelt, and Snoopy; Phoebe Mills	Photo montage	Ricky Francesco (Charlie Sheen); AP/World Wide Photos (Kaye Lani Rae Rafko); Focus On Sports (Phoebe Mills); United Features Syndicate (Charlie Brown)
1988-09-10	Kaye Lani Rafko as Miss America 1988	Photograph	Charles William Bush
1988-09-17	Summer Olympics '88	Illustration	Walt Spitzmiller
1988-09-24	Phylicia Rashad, Malcolm-Jamal Warner, Tempestt Bledsoe, Keshia Knight Pulliam, and Bill Cosby of The Cosby Show	Illustration	Richard Hess
1988-10-01	Fall Preview	Word art	Milton Glaser
1988-10-08	NBC Entertainment president Brandon Tartikoff with Maryam d'Abo of Something Is Out There, Judd Hirsch of Dear John, Gary Cole of Midnight Caller, and Kate Jackson of Baby Boom	Photograph	Mario Casilli
1988-10-15	Kevin Costner and Susan Sarandon of the film Bull Durham	Illustration	Chris Notarile
1988-10-22	The AIDS Scare and TV	Illustration	
1988-10-29	Linda Kozlowski and Harry Hamlin of Favorite Son	Photograph	
1988-11-05	Election Day: Which Network You Should Watch	Illustration	Peter Max
1988-11-12	Hart Bochner, Victoria Tennant, Robert Mitchum, Rhett Creighton, Jane Seymour in War and Remembrance	Illustration	Richard Hess
1988-11-19	"Remembering JFK... Our First TV President," featuring John F. Kennedy with Jacqueline, Caroline and John F. Kennedy Jr.	Photograph	Cecil Stoughton
1988-11-26	Muhammad Ali, Dudley Moore, Brooke Shields, Victoria Principal, Loretta Lynn, Jimmy Stewart and Barbara Walters of Barbara Walters Specials	Photograph	Mario Casilli
1988-12-03	Our Viewer Guide to the Holiday Specials: Rudolph and Friends; LeVar Burton and Louis Gossett Jr.; Michael Kim, Elizabeth Kandel, Donald Faison and Marlo Thomas	Photo montage	Rankin/Bass (Rudolph & Friends); Dean Williams (Louis Gossett Jr. & LeVar Burton); Lucille Khornak (Marlo Thomas, Donald Faison, Elizabeth Kandel, Michael Kim)
1988-12-10	Dinah Manoff, Kristy McNichol, Richard Mulligan and "Dreyfuss" of Empty Nest		
1988-12-17	Stepfanie Kramer, Sheree J. Wilson, Shari Belafonte	Photograph	Mario Casilli
1988-12-24	Angela Lansbury of Murder, She Wrote	Illustration	David Edward Byrd
1988-12-31	Sandy Duncan and Jason Bateman of The Hogan Family		

== 1989 ==
Issue date	Cover subject	Type of cover	Artist
1989-01-07	"Our 8th Annual J. Fred Muggs Awards, featuring honorees Bryant Gumbel, Jane Fonda, and Geraldo Rivera	Photo montage	
1989-01-14	Cybill Shepherd and Bruce Willis of Moonlighting	Photograph	
1989-01-21	"Rock Stars on TV," featuring Elvis Presley, Bruce Springsteen, Madonna, and Michael Jackson	Photo montage	
1989-01-28	John Goodman and Roseanne Barr of Roseanne	Illustration	
1989-02-04	"Get Ready for a Hot February," featuring Catherine Oxenberg, Burt Reynolds, Lisa Hartman, Billy Crystal, Robert Duvall and Diane Ladd	Photo montage	
1989-02-11	Larry Hagman of Dallas	Photo montage	
1989-02-18	"The Best Children's Shows on TV," featuring Mighty Mouse, ALF, Bill Cosby and Keshia Knight Pulliam, Big Bird, Pee-wee Herman and Garfield	Illustration	
1989-02-25	Victoria Principal of Naked Lies	Photograph	
1989-03-04	Vanna White of Wheel of Fortune	Photograph	
1989-03-11	"Stephen Birmingham's One-Upmanship Guide," featuring Ken Olin and Mel Harris of thirtysomething, Candice Bergen of Murphy Brown, and Corbin Bernsen of L.A. Law	Photo montage	
1989-03-18	Oprah Winfrey, Jackée and Robin Givens of The Women of Brewster Place	Photograph	
1989-03-25	"What TV Doesn't Tell You About The Oscars"	Photo montage	
1989-04-01	Susan Ruttan, Susan Dey, Jill Eikenberry and Michelle Greene of L.A. Law	Photo montage	
1989-04-08	"A Busy Person's Guide to TV: Getting the Most Out of Your Viewing," featuring Bruce Willis and Cybill Shepherd of Moonlighting; Alex Trebek of Jeopardy!; Mike Wallace of 60 Minutes; and Dan Lauria, Alley Mills, Fred Savage, Olivia d'Abo, Jason Hervey of The Wonder Years	Montage	
1989-04-15	Joan Collins of Dynasty, breaking through a picture of John Forsythe	Photograph	
1989-04-22	Jason Bateman of The Hogan Family and Kirk Cameron of Growing Pains		
1989-04-29	"May Sweeps: What's Hot," featuring Robert Mitchum and Victoria Tennant of War and Remembrance; Brigitte Nielsen of Murder by Moonlight; Holly Hunter and Ali Grant in Roe v. Wade; and David Keith as Lt. Col. Oliver North in Guts and Glory	Photo montage	
1989-05-06	"TV is 50 - Happy Birthday!" featuring John F. Kennedy Jr.; Keshia Knight Pulliam and Bill Cosby; Edwin "Buzz" Aldrin; Carroll O'Connor; Harry Morgan, Mike Farrell and Alan Alda; Desi Arnaz and Lucille Ball; Georgia Engel, Valerie Harper and Mary Tyler Moore	Photo montage	
1989-05-13	Tracy Scoggins of Dynasty	Photograph	
1989-05-20	Roseanne Barr of Roseanne	Photograph	
1989-05-27	Kirstie Alley and Ted Danson of Cheers	Illustration	John Solie
1989-06-03	Oprah Winfrey	Photograph	
1989-06-10	Fred Savage and Danica McKellar of The Wonder Years	Photograph	
1989-06-17	Donna Mills of Knots Landing	Photograph	
1989-06-24	"The Joys of Summer," featuring Tristan Rogers & Edie Lehmann of General Hospital and James DePaiva & Jessica Tuck of One Life to Live	Photo montage	
1989-07-01	"TV Favorites Go For It In Movies," featuring Virginia Madsen, Tom Selleck, Michael J. Fox and Don Harvey	Photo montage	
1989-07-08	"The Best and Worst We Saw: An Irreverent Look at the Past Season"	Photo montage	
1989-07-15	"The 1989 Network News All-Star Team," featuring Tom Brokaw, Peter Jennings, Andrea Mitchell, and Lesley Stahl	Photo montage	
1989-07-22	"TV Stars to Watch — and Ignore — if You Want to Look Sharp," featuring Roseanne Barr and Nicollette Sheridan	Photo montage	
1989-07-29	David Faustino, Christina Applegate, Ed O'Neill, Katey Sagal, and Buck the dog of Married... with Children	Photograph	
1989-08-05	"In Defense of Tabloid TV," featuring Phil Donahue, Geraldo Rivera, Maury Povich, and Oprah Winfrey	Photo montage	
1989-08-12	"TV's New News Queens," featuring Mary Alice Williams, Maria Shriver, Diane Sawyer, and Connie Chung	Photo montage	
1989-08-19	Crystal Gayle and Loretta Lynn	Photograph	
1989-08-26	Oprah Winfrey		
1989-09-02	"Two Fall Classics," featuring Miss America 1989 Gretchen Carlson and NFL players Lawrence Taylor, Mark Rypien & Eric Dorsey	Photo montage	
1989-09-09	Fall Preview (Special Issue)	Text graphic	Jeffrey Lynch
1989-09-16	Roseanne Barr of Roseanne and Bill Cosby of The Cosby Show	Illustration	Chris Notarile
1989-09-23	"The 11 Stars You'd Better Keep an Eye On," featuring Kimberly Foster of Dallas, Khrystyne Haje of Head of the Class, and Richard Tyson of Hardball	Photo montage	
1989-09-30	Elizabeth Taylor and Mark Harmon of Sweet Bird of Youth	Photograph	
1989-10-07	Delta Burke of Designing Women and Gerald McRaney of Major Dad	Photograph	
1989-10-14	"Hot Choices This Week," featuring The World Series, Perry King and Chynna Phillips of Roxanne: The Prize Pulitzer, and Faye Dunaway of Cold Sassy Tree	Photo montage	
1989-10-21	Jamie Lee Curtis of Anything But Love	Photograph	
1989-10-28	Lane Smith as Richard Nixon of The Final Days; Inset: Richard Grieco of Booker	Photograph	
1989-11-04	"Knockout November," featuring Farrah Fawcett of Small Sacrifices, Valerie Bertinelli of Taken Away, and Michael Keaton of the film Batman	Photo montage	
1989-11-11	Richard Chamberlain of Island Son	Photograph	
1989-11-18	Courteney Cox and Barry Bostwick of Till We Meet Again	Photograph	
1989-11-25	Victoria Principal of Blind Witness	Photograph	
1989-12-02	"Viewer's Guide to the Holiday Specials," featuring Bob Hope, Natalie Wood and Edmund Gwenn of Miracle on 34th Street, Peanuts, Julie Andrews and Carol Burnett of Julie and Carol Together Again, and Kenny Rogers Jr. and Kenny Rogers of Christmas in America: A Love Story	Photo montage	
1989-12-09	"The 80s," featuring Vanna White, Don Johnson, Oprah Winfrey, Ted Koppel, Hulk Hogan, David Letterman, Bill Cosby, Joan Collins, ALF, Sam Donaldson, Ronald Reagan, Tom Selleck, Larry Hagman, Michael J. Fox, Photo by Peter Kredenser Dan Rather, and Roseanne Barr	Photo montage	ALF: Mario Casilli
1989-12-16	Neil Patrick Harris of Doogie Howser, M.D. Inset: Lucille Ball	Photograph	
1989-12-23	Candice Bergen of Murphy Brown; Inset: Scott Bakula of Quantum Leap	Photograph	
1989-12-30	Julia Duffy of Newhart and Jean Smart of Designing Women with New Years babies Seib Blake and Lindsay Reece; Inset: Susan Lucci of All My Children	Photograph	

== Sources ==
- Covers and table of contents page descriptions for the various issues.
- TV Guide: Fifty Years of Television, New York, NY: Crown Publishers, 2002. ISBN 1-4000-4685-8
- Stephen Hofer, ed., TV Guide: The Official Collectors Guide, Braintree, Massachusetts: BangZoom Publishers, 2006. ISBN 0-9772927-01-1.
- "50 Greatest TV Guide Covers", article from the June 15, 2002 edition of TV Guide
- Information from ellwanger.tv's TV Guide collection section
