= Don Weller =

Don Weller may refer to:

- Don Weller (painter), American painter
- Don Weller (musician) (1940–2020), British jazz musician
