= Bob Willoughby =

American photographer

Robert Hanley "Bob" Willoughby (June 30, 1927 – 18 December 2009) was an American photographer. Popular Photography called him "The man who virtually invented the photojournalistic motion picture still."

== Early life and education ==
Willoughby was born in Los Angeles, California. He pursued photography after receiving a camera as a gift on his 12th birthday. Willoughby studied photography at the film school at the University of Southern California and worked under graphic designer Saul Bass at the Kahn Institute of Art.

== Photojournalism ==
Between 1948 and 1954, Willoughby's exhibitions of photographs of jazz musicians and dancers led to a contract with Globe Photos, and one, of a screaming female audience, was selected by Edward Steichen for The Family of Man exhibit at the Museum of Modern Art which toured the world to be seen by 9 million visitors. Later, he worked for Harper's Bazaar magazine where his photographs illustrated arts and culture articles.

== Movie stills photographer ==
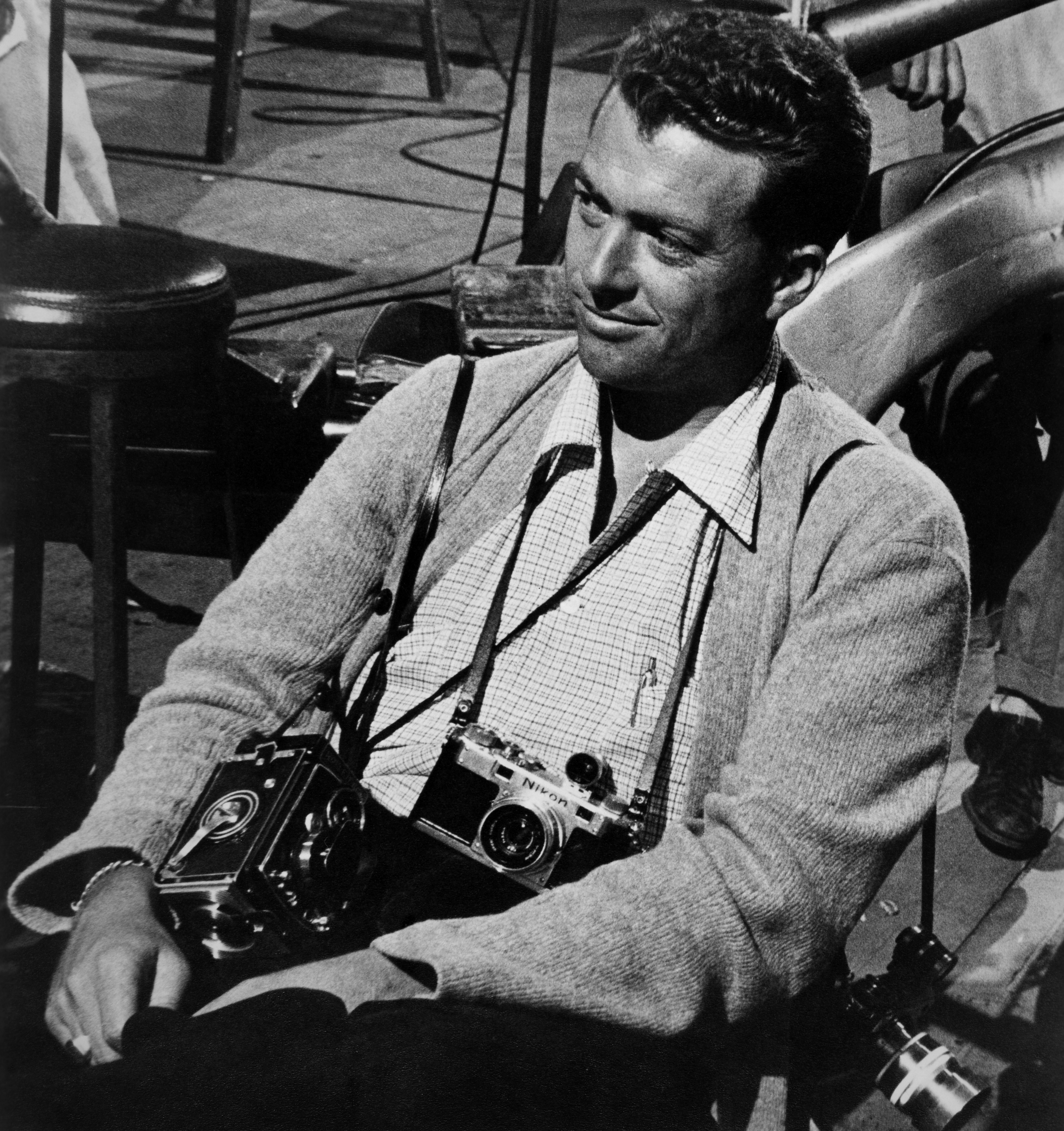
Bob Willoughby on set

Willoughby's big break came when he was assigned by six magazines to photograph Judy Garland during the filming of A Star is Born (1954). Subsequently, he was hired by Warner Brothers to film the extensive "Born in a Trunk" sequence. This was the first time a motion picture studio hired a special or unit photographer to specifically take photographs for sale to magazines. The result was a Life magazine cover featuring a close-up portrait of the pixie-faced singer in costume. It was her second Life cover and his first.

Much of Willoughby's popularity stemmed from his ability to capture film stars in unguarded moments. Director Sydney Pollack said in the introduction to Bob's autobiography: "Sometimes a filmmaker gets a look at a photograph taken on his own set and sees the 'soul' of his film in one still photograph. It's rare, but it happens. It happened to me in 1969, the first time I looked at the work of Bob Willoughby during the filming of They Shoot Horses, Don't They?".

In 1963, Willoughby built the first remote radio-controlled camera for on-set still photography. This led to other innovations that enabled him to take still photographs identical to the film footage. Much of his best work revolved around stars like Audrey Hepburn, Frank Sinatra, Elizabeth Taylor or Marlene Dietrich.

== Later life ==
Willoughby continued to photograph for the rest of his life. He lived in Ireland for 17 years where he used his photographic skills to illustrate ancient Irish poetry text with photographs of the countryside. In addition, he authored books on photography and other subjects. He lived his last years in Vence, France, where he continued a very active professional life. He died of cancer on 18 December 2009. Willoughby's images are represented by the Motion Picture and Television Photo Archive and can be viewed by the public at mptvimages.com

== Collections ==
His photographs are held in collections and exhibited worldwide including:

- Museum of Modern Art, New York
- The National Portrait Gallery, Washington, DC and London, England
- The National Media Museum, Bradford, UK
- The Bibliothèque nationale de France in Paris, France
- Musee de la Photographie, Charleroi, Belgium

== Publications ==
- Willoughby, Bob; Schickel, Richard (1974). The platinum years. New York: Random House. ISBN 9780394493800. OCLC 841748.
- Willoughby, Bob (1981). Voices from ancient Ireland : a book of early Irish poetry. London: Pan Books. ISBN 9780330262743. OCLC 8413924.
- Willoughby, Bob; Freeman, Russ (1990). Jazz in LA (in German). Kiel: Nieswand. ISBN 9783926048417. OCLC 28543274.
- Willoughby, Bob (1993). Audrey Hepburn : photo-documents. Tokyo: Pacific Press Service, Toky. ISBN 9784022567031. OCLC 801202624.
- Willoughby, Bob (2001). Hollywood : a journey through the stars; a photographic autobiography. New York: Assouline. ISBN 9782843232619. OCLC 48496177.
- Willoughby, Bob (2002). Audrey : an intimate collection. London: Vision On. ISBN 9781903399262. OCLC 48835752.
- Willoughby, Bob (2002). Sinatra, an intimate collection. London: Vision On. ISBN 9781903399651. OCLC 51464964.
- The Star Makers: On Set With Hollywood's Greatest Directors (2003)
- Liz an Intimate Collection: Photographs of Elizabeth Taylor (2004)
- Audrey Hepburn: Photographs 1953-1966 (2010)
- Bob Willoughby: A Cinematic Life (2022)
