= John Engstead =

American photographer (1909–1983)

John Engstead (22 September 1909 - 15 April 1983) was an American photographer. Engstead was born in California, and began his career in 1926, when he was hired as an office boy by Paramount Pictures' head of studio publicity, Harold Harley.

In 1927, Engstead pleased his boss by arranging a photo session for actress Clara Bow with photographer Otto Dyar using an outdoor setting which was unusual at that time. Engstead's creative direction of photographs of actress Louise Brooks led to a promotion to art supervisor, where he oversaw the production of Paramount's publicity stills.

In 1932, due to a strike by photographers, Engstead assumed the position of studio portrait photographer, despite having never previously photographed anyone. Actor Cary Grant posed for his practice shots. He returned to his job as art supervisor after the strike was resolved.

In 1941, Paramount Pictures fired Engstead, and Harper's Bazaar hired him for freelance advertising and portrait photography assignments. From 1941 to 1949, he took fashion photography assignments from numerous other magazines, including Collier's, Esquire, House Beautiful, Ladies Home Journal, Life, Look, Mademoiselle, McCall's, Vogue, and Women's Home Companion.

In the 1940s, Engstead photographed many celebrities, including Joan Crawford, Bette Davis, Maureen O'Hara and Shirley Temple. Unlike other photographers, he often shot his subjects at home or outdoors, and his portraits of Judy Garland in Carmel, California were particularly successful. During this decade, he built a studio in Los Angeles that became a gathering place for celebrities.

Engstead continued to photograph movie stars and other celebrities through the 1950s (Marilyn Monroe or Marlene Dietrich) and 1960s. He produced promotional material for many television personalities, including Pat Boone, Carmel Quinn, Donna Reed, Ozzie and Harriet, Eve Arden, and Lucille Ball. He also shot cover photos for albums recorded by singers such as Peggy Lee and Connie Francis, as well as society portraits. His work extended into governmental figures in the 1950s, including then-Second Lady Pat Nixon. Engstead closed his studio in 1970 but continued to accept special portrait and television assignments until his death in West Hollywood, California, in 1984 at age 72. Engstead's images are represented by the Motion Picture and Television Photo Archive and can be viewed by the public at MPTV.net
