= America (talk show) =

- Presented by: Stuart Damon; Sarah Purcell; McLean Stevenson
- Narrated by: Charlie O'Donnell
- Country of origin: United States
- Original language: English

Production
- Running time: 60 minutes
- Production company: Paramount Domestic Television

Original release
- Network: Syndicated
- Release: September 16, 1985 – January 3, 1986

America is an American lifestyle and variety talk show that aired in daily syndication from September 19, 1985 until January 3, 1986. The show, which was purposely designed to be a program to serve as a late afternoon lead-in for its affiliates' news broadcasts, was a joint production of Post-Newsweek Stations and Paramount Domestic Television and emanated from Paramount Studios in Hollywood, California.

Despite Paramount's expectations for America, the program was unable to find an audience and was cancelled after sixteen weeks on the air.

== Format ==
When America premiered, the show featured actors Stuart Damon and McLean Stevenson and former Real People host Sarah Purcell as presenters.

Each show began with announcer Charlie O'Donnell saying "good afternoon and welcome to America," then giving the date and a rundown of the topics covered by the show in the sixty minutes to come. After that, the hosts were introduced and the show began. Feature stories included focuses on people, places, and trends, as well as an interview segment with a celebrity. Some stories were presented by reporters working for the affiliate stations; for example, the December 18, 1985, episode featured a story about a Little Rock, Arkansas, girl in need of a liver transplant that was presented by then-KATV reporter Greg Hurst.

== Ratings ==
In their attempt to sell America to local stations at the 1985 NATPE convention, Paramount presented the format to station owners as a program that would garner significant interest from viewers with its lifestyle-based content and, thus, entice those viewers to stay tuned to their stations for the newscast to follow. Among the stations that bought America were the stations owned by production partner Post-Newsweek Stations (consisting at the time of WDIV-TV in Detroit, WFSB-TV in Hartford, and WJXT-TV in Jacksonville), all five of CBS' owned-and-operated stations (WCBS-TV in New York, WBBM-TV in Chicago, KCBS-TV in Los Angeles, KMOX-TV in St. Louis, and WCAU-TV in Philadelphia), and ABC-owned KGO-TV in San Francisco. Paramount had also tried to entice stations to pick up America by offering the talk show at a discounted rate.

Despite Paramount's best efforts, America met with low ratings from the start. The year 1985 was a major one for syndicated programming as stations had many options to choose from to fill slots in their schedules. This led to an overabundance of choices and not enough places for them to go; new shows that were able to get slots like Paramount wanted for America often found themselves facing off against a popular talk show like The Phil Donahue Show. In other markets, shows like America would be up against other first-run syndicated programming that had established audiences, such as the game shows Jeopardy! and Wheel of Fortune or courtroom series like The People’s Court or Divorce Court. Further still, some markets did well with reruns of comedic or dramatic series, or even cartoons, in the late afternoon.

Whatever programs America was competing with in the timeslots it occupied, it never seemed to make headway; this was something that Paramount had not anticipated. The ratings were also a drag on both production companies' finances. In an article in the New York Times, it was reported that America cost $400,000 a week to produce, which Paramount and Post-Newsweek were hoping to recoup through advertising sales. The low ratings meant less revenue coming in, a problem that was exacerbated by the discount being offered by Paramount to potential affiliates as mentioned above.

By November 1985, the ratings had sunk even further. For instance, WCBS, its largest affiliate, reported that America was so lowly rated (according to the New York Times, it ranked fifth in its timeslot against Donahue on WNBC, a one hour game show block on WABC, and various other programming on the market's three independent stations) that it had dragged down the ratings of its 5 PM newscast, which was the opposite of what Paramount had intended to have happen. WBBM and KCBS would also report similar declines, while WCAU had drawn such poor ratings with America that it had already relocated the show to air before The CBS Morning News. Stuart Damon, perhaps seeing the writing on the wall, elected to leave America at the end of the month.

Then, on December 13, 1985, what Paramount later referred to as a "domino effect" would begin and result in the ultimate cancellation of the struggling talk show. On that day, CBS announced that after the episode scheduled to air concluded, it would be immediately pulling America from its five stations, a move that cost the show its major market clearances. Paramount was initially undeterred, and in a statement released shortly after CBS' decision, they declared that America would remain in production. However, on December 15, its affiliates in Atlanta, Cleveland, Tampa, and several others informed Paramount that they would be following suit and dropping America.

Paramount decided that it was no longer worth the effort, having lost significant amounts of money trying to keep the show running and now having to deal with the mass exodus of affiliates putting a further dent in the already abysmal ratings. On December 19, Paramount announced that it would be ceasing production of America, with the final episode to be broadcast on January 3, 1986. McLean Stevenson was dismissed from the show after the announcement was made, and Sarah Purcell continued alone until the eightieth and final episode aired. Purcell thanked the audience for their support over the previous sixteen weeks, and a montage of the show's crew backed with Bruce Springsteen's "Glory Days" played as the end credits rolled.

One Paramount executive said that he was "sorry" that America had flopped so badly, but he also said that he felt that it was the type of program that was needed in the daytime television landscape.
