= Liaison =

Liaison is the French word for a connection or relationship in many domains. It may refer to:

== Social relationships ==
- Affair, an unfaithful sexual relationship
- Collaboration
- Co-operation

== Arts and entertainment ==
- Liaison (TV series), a British–French series on Apple TV+
- Liaisons (Desperate Housewives), a 2007 drama episode
- Liaisons (Star Trek: The Next Generation), a 1993 sci-fi episode
- Liaisons: Re-Imagining Sondheim from the Piano, a 2015 album by Anthony de Mare
- "Liaisons", a song from Sondheim's 1973 musical A Little Night Music

== Government and politics ==
- Liaison Agency Flanders-Europe, a Flemish government body
- Liaison Committee (House of Commons of the United Kingdom), of the UK Parliament's lower house
- Liaison Committee (House of Lords), of the UK Parliament's upper house

== Military ==
- Liaison aircraft, a small non-combat plane
  - Liaison pilot, in World War II
    - Liaison Pilot Badge, of the United States Army Air Forces
- Liaison officer, who coordinates different forces or units
- Military Liaison Element, American special forces at embassies abroad
- Military liaison missions, in Cold War Germany
- Special Liaison Unit, who disseminated Ultra intel in World War II

== Other uses ==
- Liaison (French), in phonology
- Air Alliance, a Canadian airline (call sign: Liaison)
- Liaison psychiatry, treating comorbid mental conditions
- Liaison Committee on Medical Education, a North American accreditation body
- Liaison Dunkerque-Escaut, a series of canals in France
- Liaison, a sauce or soup thickener in cuisine

== See also ==
- Pearl (drag queen), sometimes known as Pearl Liaison
- Liaisons dangereuses (disambiguation)
