= Dangerous Liaisons (disambiguation) =

Dangerous Liaisons is a 1988 American film adaptation of a Christopher Hampton play based on Les Liaisons dangereuses, a French novel by Choderlos de Laclos.

Dangerous Liaisons may also refer to:

- Les Liaisons dangereuses, a French epistolary novel by Choderlos de Laclos published in 1782, the source work for all later adaptions
- Les Liaisons dangereuses (film), a French adaptation by Roger Vadim released in 1959
- Les Liaisons Dangereuses (play), Christopher Hampton's 1985 play based on the novel
- The Dangerous Liaisons, a 1994 opera by Conrad Susa, adapted by Philip Littell from the novel
- Les Liaisons dangereuses (miniseries), a 2003 French television mini-series directed by Josée Dayan
- Untold Scandal (film), a South Korean film directed by E J-yong based on de Laclos' novel
- Dangerous Liaisons (2005 film), a 2005 gay adult film adapted by Tony DiMarco from the novel
- "Dangerous Liaisons," the sixth episode of Hidden Palms
- Dangerous Liaisons (2012 film), Chinese film directed by Hur Jin-ho, a South Korean director, based on de Laclos' novel
- Dangerous Liaisons (The Vampire Diaries), a 2012 episode of the television series The Vampire Diaries
- Dangerous Liaisons (Arrow), a 2017 episode of the television series Arrow
- Dangerous Liaisons (Supergirl), a 2019 episode of the television series Supergirl
- "Dangerous Liaisons," a track on Black Midi's 2022 album Hellfire
- Dangerous Liaisons (TV series), a 2022 American period drama television series

== See also ==
- Valmont (film), a 1989 film directed by Miloš Forman, based on the novel
- Cruel Intentions, a 1999 film directed by Roger Kumble, a modern retelling of the novel
- Liaisons dangereuses (disambiguation)
- Michael Jackson's Dangerous Liaisons
