= Gene Trindl =

American photographer

Gene Trindl (April 14, 1924 – June 29, 2004) was an American photographer and the most prolific creator of covers for TV Guide magazine. He created more than 200 covers and shot more than 800 assignments in total for the magazine. Trindl was based in Los Angeles. He died from pancreatic cancer. Trindl's images are represented by the Motion Picture and Television Photo Archive and can be viewed by the public at mptvimages.com . His photographs have been published in reputed American magazines like Life, The Saturday Evening Post and Collier's.

== Life ==
Eugene Carl Trindl was born on April 14, 1924, in Los Angeles, California. His passion for photography began from his days as a Boy Scout. He served in the United States Army Air Forces from January 1943 to February 1946. He received a degree from Woodbury College.

== Works ==
In a career spanning over 50 years, he was acclaimed from International Photography Awards 2003 for Outstanding Achievement in Portrait Photography. His early career was marked by apprenticeships, teaching at Pierce College in California, and co-producing some 22 educational films. His collection,Hollywood: The 50s and 60s is considered as both a behind the lens and behind the scene view of Hollywood. The Gene Trindl Media Trust has over 90,000 edited slide images and tens of thousands of film negatives on file.

His subjects included a Who's Who of Hollywood with notable personalities such as Frank Sinatra, Doris Day, Rock Hudson, and Benny and Burns, Alfred Hitchcock, Orson Welles and Fred Astaire are more contemporary faces as Tom Selleck, the cast of Star Trek, and Michael Jackson.

== Filmography ==
Year	Film	Photography
1989	An Innocent Man	Yes
1990	3 Men and a Little Lady	Yes
1992	Mr. Baseball	Yes

Year	TELEVISION	Photography
1991	Casey's Gift: For Love of a Child	Yes
2001	20th Century Fox: The Blockbuster Years	Yes

== See also ==
- List of TV Guide covers
