= Skip Stephenson =

American actor

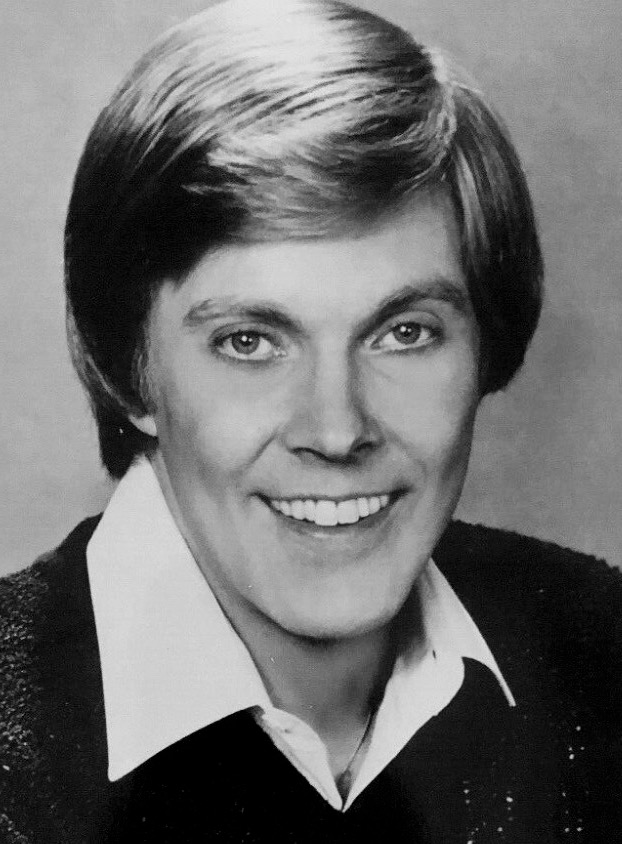
- Stephenson in 1983
- Born: Charles Frederick Stephenson; April 18, 1940; Omaha, Nebraska, U.S.
- Died: May 18, 1992 (aged 52); Los Angeles, California, U.S.
- Children: 3

Comedy career
- Years active: 1971–1992
- Genre: Observational comedy
- Subject: Current events

Charles Frederick "Skip" Stephenson (April 18, 1940 – May 18, 1992) was an American actor, comedian, and musician. He was born in Omaha, Nebraska, and graduated in 1958 from Holy Name High School. After attending a year at The University of Omaha, Stephenson took a job as a DJ in Alliance, Nebraska.

== Stand-up comedy ==
In the 1970s he moved to Los Angeles, where he performed stand-up comedy at the L.A. Cabaret Comedy Club in Encino and the legendary Comedy Store. On October 6, 1977, he appeared on The Tonight Show Starring Johnny Carson. He released a comedy album, The Real Comedy of Skip Stephenson on Laff Records. In 1991, he starred in the video Skip Stephenson Live at the Comedy Store.

== Real People ==
His big break came in 1979 as the co-host of NBC's Real People. Wearing bright crew-necked sweaters, he was known for his quirky comments and playful flirtings with co-host Sarah Purcell.

== Other appearances ==
Alongside his success in comedy came acting and appearances on The Love Boat, Hart to Hart, Match Game, Hollywood Squares, Password Plus, The Tonight Show Starring Johnny Carson, The Dinah Shore Show and The Merv Griffin Show. He was the last star to play the Head-to-Head Match on the last episode of Match Game in 1982, and his response was a match that won the contestant $10,000.

== Music ==
He wrote country music, with the song "In this Honky Tonk Saloon", copyrighted in 1977. In 1982, he told UPI his style was between Don Williams and Waylon Jennings.

== Death ==
Stephenson died of a heart attack at his home in 1992, exactly one month after his 52nd birthday.
