= Ken Whitmore =

British author

Ken Whitmore (born 22 December 1937, in Hanley, Staffordshire) is an author of radio plays, stage plays, short stories and poetry. His writing is characterised by black comedy and fantastic ideas, such as the complete disappearance of a man’s house, family and dog (One of Our Commuters is Missing) and the need for all mankind to jump in the air simultaneously (Jump! - a work which was produced on radio, stage, TV and as a book.)

His first radio play in 1974 was Haywire at Humbleford Flag and there swiftly followed a stream of high-quality radio plays, ending with The Final Twist (from a stage play written in collaboration with Alfred Bradley.)

Whitmore’s adaptations for radio are Going Under from the novel by the Russian Lydia Chukovskaya, a five-part adaptation of Brighton Rock by Graham Greene, and an eight-part adaptation of Fame is the Spur by Howard Spring.

His published stage plays are Jump for Your Life, Pen Friends, La Bolshie Vita, The Final Twist and The Turn of the Screw, adapted from the story by Henry James.

Paul Donovan on TimesOnline quoted Whitmore as saying that his dearest wish was to write a drama that would stop people ironing.

== Works for Radio ==
- One of our Commuters is Missing
- Jump for your life!
- The Story of a Penny Suit
- Colder Than of Late
- Out for the Count
- The Caucasian in the Woodpile
- Pen Friends
- Watch the Forest Grow
- The Lackey's Daughter
- Always in Love with Amy
- A Decent British Murder
- The Sport of Angels
- The Great Times Crossword Conspiracy
- Travelling Hopefully
- La Bolshie Vita
- Dithering Heights
- The Red Telephone Box
- The Town that Helped Itself
- The Gingerbread House (Winner of the Giles Cooper Award for best plays radio of the year)
- The Cold Embrace
- Winter Music
- A Room in Budapest
- The Final Twist
