= Richard Hess =

American Old Testament scholar (born 1954)

Richard Samuel Hess
- Born: December 17, 1954 (age 71)
- Title: Distinguished Professor of Old Testament and Semitic Languages

Academic background
- Education: Wheaton College, Trinity Evangelical Divinity School
- Alma mater: Hebrew Union College (PhD)
- Thesis: Amarna Proper Names (1984)

Academic work
- Discipline: Biblical studies
- Sub-discipline: Old Testament and Semitic languages studies
- Institutions: International Christian College; University of Roehampton; Denver Seminary
- Website: https://oldtestamentquestions.com/

Richard Samuel Hess (born 17 December 1954) is an American Old Testament scholar. He is Distinguished Professor of Old Testament and Semitic Languages at Denver Seminary.

Hess has degrees from Wheaton College, Trinity Evangelical Divinity School, and Hebrew Union College. He previously taught at International Christian College, Glasgow, and the University of Roehampton, London.

Hess is editor of the Denver Journal, and founder and Editor of the Institute for Biblical Research's BBR Supplement Series and Dissertation Series. He was previously editor of the Bulletin for Biblical Research. He is a member of the New International Version's Committee on Bible Translation.

== Works ==
=== Thesis ===
- Hess, Richard S. (1984). Amarna Proper Names (Ph.D.). N: Hebrew Union College -Jewish Institute of Religion. OCLC 19345765.

=== Books ===
- ——— (1993). Amarna Personal Names. Dissertation series (American Schools of Oriental Research), no. 9. Winona Lake, IN: Eisenbrauns. ISBN 978-0-931-46471-3. OCLC 28708399.
- ——— (1993). Studies in the personal names of Genesis 1-11. Alter Orient und Altes Testament. Vol. 234. Kevelaer; Neukirchen-Vluyn: Verlag Butzon & Bercker; Neukirchener Verlag. ISBN 978-3-766-69869-8. OCLC 29535269.
- ———; Satterthwaite, P. E.; Wenham, Gordon J., eds. (1994). He Swore an Oath: Biblical themes from Genesis 12-50. Carlisle, UK; Grand Rapids, MI: Paternoster Press; Baker Book House. ISBN 978-0-801-04398-7. OCLC 30318222.
- ———; Tsumura, David Toshio, eds. (1994). I Studied Inscriptions from Before the Flood : ancient Near Eastern, literary, and linguistic approaches to Genesis 1-11. Sources for Biblical and Theological Study. Vol. 4. Winona Lake, IN: Eisenbrauns. ISBN 978-0-931-46488-1. OCLC 31239619.
- ——— (1996). Joshua: an introduction and commentary. Tyndale Old Testament Commentaries. Vol. 6. Downers Grove, IL: InterVarsity Press. ISBN 978-0-830-81433-6. OCLC 35008147.
- ———; Porter, Stanley E., eds. (1999). Translating the Bible: problems and prospects. Journal for the Study of the New Testament, Supplement Series. Vol. 173. Sheffield, England: Sheffield Academic Press. ISBN 978-1-850-75918-8. OCLC 49773539.
- ——— (2005). Song of Songs. Baker Commentary on the Old Testament Wisdom and Psalms. Grand Rapids, MI: Baker Academic. ISBN 9780801027123. OCLC 56825191.
- ———; Klingbeil, Gerald A.; Ray, Paul J., eds. (2008). Critical issues in early Israelite history. Bulletin for Biblical Research Supplements. Vol. 3. Winona Lake, IN: Eisenbrauns. ISBN 978-1-575-06804-6. OCLC 253638233.
- ——— (2008). Joshua: an introduction and commentary. Tyndale Old Testament Commentaries. Vol. 6. Downers Grove, IL: InterVarsity Press. ISBN 978-0-8308-1433-6 OCLC 35008147 Reprinted, 2008.
- ——— (2009). Studies in the personal names of Genesis 1-11. Alter Orient und Altes Testament. Vol. 234. Kevelaer; Neukirchen-Vluyn: Verlag Butzon & Bercker; Neukirchener Verlag. ISBN 978-3-7666-9869-8 OCLC 29535269 Reprinted, Winona Lake: Eisenbrauns, 2009.
- ——— (2016). The Old Testament: A Historical, Theological, and Critical Introduction. Grand Rapids, MI: Baker Academic. ISBN 978-0801037146.

=== Books Co-Authored ===
- ——— “Joshua,” pp. 2–93 in J. H. Walton, ed., Zondervan Illustrated Bible Backgrounds Commentary Volume 2. Joshua, Judges, Ruth, 1 & 2 Samuel. Grand Rapids: Zondervan, 2009.
- ——— "Leviticus," pp. 563–826 in T. Longman III and D. E .Garland eds., The Expositor's Bible Commentary Revised Edition 1: Genesis–Leviticus. Grand Rapids: Zondervan, 2008.
- ——— Names in the Study of Biblical History: David, YHWH Names, and the Role of Personal Names, co-authored with Francis I. Andersen; Buried History Monograph 2; Melbourne: Australian Institute of Archaeology, 2007.

=== Books Edited ===
- ——— NIV Biblical Theology Study Bible, co-editor with Don Carson, Douglas Moo, and Desmond Alexander, Grand Rapids: Zondervan, 2018. Originally published as NIV Zondervan Study Bible, 2015.

=== Chapters ===
- ——— (1994). "One Hundred Fifty Years of Comparative Studies on Genesis 1-11: an overview". In Hess, Richard S.; Tsumura, David Toshio (eds.). I Studied Inscriptions from Before the Flood : ancient Near Eastern, literary, and linguistic approaches to Genesis 1-11. Sources for Biblical and Theological Study. Vol. 4. Winona Lake, IN: Eisenbrauns. pp. 3–26. ISBN 978-0-931-46488-1. OCLC 31239619.
- ——— (1994). "The Genealogies of Genesis 1-11 and Comparative Literature". In Hess, Richard S.; Tsumura, David Toshio (eds.). I Studied Inscriptions from Before the Flood : ancient Near Eastern, literary, and linguistic approaches to Genesis 1-11. Sources for Biblical and Theological Study. Vol. 4. Winona Lake, IN: Eisenbrauns. pp. 58–72. ISBN 978-0-931-46488-1. OCLC 31239619.
- ——— (2008). "The Jericho and Ai of the Book of Joshua". In ———; Klingbeil, Gerald A.; Ray, Paul J. (eds.). Critical issues in early Israelite history. Bulletin for Biblical Research Supplements. Vol. 3. Winona Lake, IN: Eisenbrauns. pp. 33–46. ISBN 978-1-575-06804-6. OCLC 253638233.

=== Research Articles ===
- ——— “In the Garden of Xerxes’ Palace: A New Examination of the Pavement in Esther 1:6,” Vetus Testamentum (2023) 1-11 online. doi:10.1163/15685330-bja10144
- ——— “History of Ancient Israelite Religion,” in Christopher Mathews ed., Oxford Bibliographies in Biblical Studies (New York: Oxford University Press, May 2023) https://www.oxfordbibliographies.com/display/document/obo-9780195393361/obo-9780195393361-0315.xml#backToTop. doi:10.1093/obo/9780195393361-0315
- ——— “Deities in the Ammonite Personal Names,” pp. 177–82 in James K. Hoffmeier, Richard E. Averbeck, J. Caleb Howard and Wolfgang Zwickel eds., “Now These Records Are Ancient:” Studies in Ancient Near Eastern and Biblical History, Language and Culture in Honor of K. Lawson Younger, Jr. (Ägypten und Altes Testament Band 114; Münster: Zaphon, 2022).
- ——— “Did Josiah Enact a Monotheistic Reform? Debating Belief in One God in Preexilic Judah Through 2 Kings 22-3: “Engagement: 2 Kings 22-3: Belief in One God in Preexilic Judah?” pp. 135–50; “Continuing the Dialogue on Monotheism: Response to Nathan MacDonald,” pp. 177–81; “Final Reflections: Some Observations on Nathan MacDonald’s Response,” pp. 185–87; “(With Nathan MacDonald) Some Joint Concluding Reflections on Monotheism,” p. 191; in Rebecca S. Watson and Adrian H. W. Curtis eds., Conversations on Canaanite and Biblical Themes: Creation, Chaos and Monotheism (Berlin: Walter de Gruyter, 2022).
- ——— “Appendix 2: Apologetic Issues in the Old Testament,” pp. 717–31 in Douglas Groothuis, Christian Apologetics: A Comprehensive Case for Biblical Faith (2nd edition; Downers Grove: IVP Academic, 2022).
- ——— “Cultural Contexts Compared: The Onomastic Profiles of the Books of Joshua and Judges,” pp. 413–22 in Ralph K. Hawkins, Erasmus Gaß, and Dror Ben-Yosef eds., wtljn: A Memorial Volume for Adam Zertal (Alter Orient und Altes Testament Band 454; Münster: Ugarit-Verlag, 2021).
- ——— “The COVID-19 Virus, Illness, and Biblical Interpretation in Its Ancient Context,” Canon and Culture: A Journal of Biblical Interpretation in Context 14.2 (2020): 51-83.
