= Liaisons dangereuses (disambiguation) =

Les Liaisons dangereuses is a 1782 French epistolary novel by Choderlos de Laclos.

Les Liaisons dangereuses may also refer to:

- Les Liaisons dangereuses (film), 1959, and a soundtrack album
- Les Liaisons Dangereuses (play), a 1985 play adapted by Christopher Hampton
- Les Liaisons dangereuses (miniseries), a 2003 TV miniseries
- Liaisons Dangereuses (band), a 1980s German band, and the title of a 1981 album

== See also ==
- Dangerous Liaisons (disambiguation)
