= Michael Jackson's Dangerous Liaisons =

- Author: Carl Tom
- Language: English
- Subject: Michael Jackson
- Genre: Non-fiction
- Publication date: 2010
- Pages: 623
- ISBN: 978 1848763 401

Michael Jackson`s Dangerous Liaisons is a book by Carl Tom.
