= Bruce Stark =

American cartoonist

Bruce Stark caricatured the cast of Hill Street Blues for the cover of the June 1, 1985 issue of TV Guide.

Bruce Stark (1933 - December 29, 2012) was an American artist noted for his caricatures of entertainment and sports figures.

Born in 1933 in New York, he moved with his family at age three to New Jersey. After serving with the Navy during the Korean War, he attended the School of Visual Arts, dug ditches, drove a truck and freelanced artwork, finally landing a permanent job in 1960 as a staff artist with the New York Daily News, where he contributed celebrity caricatures and sports cartoons for the next 22 years, continuing to live in New Jersey with his wife Pat and two sons, Bob and Ron.

During those decades, Stark also created covers for Time, Fortune, Industry Week, Forbes and TV Guide, plus numerous paperback covers. He contributed interior artwork to Reader's Digest, Mad, The Saturday Evening Post, Golf Digest and other magazines.

He died on December 29, 2012, of emphysema at the age of 79.

== Animation ==
Rankin/Bass Productions produced an animated television special, The Mad, Mad, Mad Comedians, telecast April 7, 1970, on ABC. It combined actual voices with Bruce Stark's animated caricatures of Jack Benny, George Burns, Phyllis Diller, George Jessel, Jack E. Leonard, Groucho Marx, the Smothers Brothers, Flip Wilson and Henny Youngman. Paul Frees supplied the voices of W.C. Fields, Chico Marx and Zeppo Marx.

Listed in Who's Who in America for over 20 years, Stark was a two-time winner of the National Cartoonists Society's Reuben Category Award for Best Sports Cartoonist of the Year (1966, 1975), as well as Best Special Features Cartoonist for 1968.

== Awards and exhibitions ==
His work is represented in the permanent collections of the Everett Dirksen Library, the Baseball Hall of Fame in Cooperstown, New York and the Basketball Hall of Fame in Springfield, Massachusetts. For three years (1970, 1971, 1973), he won the Newspaper Guild of New York's Page One Award for Best Sports Cartoon of the Year. His one-man shows include the Art Institute in Pittsburgh, the University of Pennsylvania (1970) and the New York Bank for Savings (1971). He retired from the Daily News in 1982, but continued to freelance.

His caricature originals have been requested by many of his subjects, including Art Carney, Xavier Cugat, Buddy Hackett, Suzanne Pleshette, Priscilla Presley and Ted Williams.

== Family ==
His son, Ron Stark, is also an artist, focusing on sports art and illustration since 1991. Living in Indian Harbour Beach, Florida with his wife Trish and their four children (Elizabeth, Jack, Chipper, Victoria), Ron has illustrated for books, magazines, newspapers and Topps cards. His oil painting of Knute Rockne can be seen on Knute Rockne: A Portrait of a Notre Dame Legend by Michael R. Steele, and he Illustrated Peter Golenbock's book, The Spirit of St. Louis. Artwork created by Ron Stark for Ted Williams' personal collection was later donated to the Ted Williams Museum.
