= Charles Santore =

American illustrator (1935–2019)

- Born: March 16, 1935; Philadelphia, Pennsylvania, U.S.
- Died: August 11, 2019 (aged 84); Philadelphia, Pennsylvania, U.S.
- Education: Museum School of Art (University of the Arts)
- Occupation: Illustrator
- Years active: 1985–2019

Charles Joseph Santore (March 16, 1935 – August 11, 2019) was an American illustrator best known for his children's books. His work is on display permanently at the Brandywine River Museum of Art and the Museum of Modern Art. He won the Hamilton King award from the New York Society of Illustrators in 1972. His book William the Curious was honored in the 1998 Storytelling World 'Stories for Pre-Adolescent Listeners' category. His most popular works include his celebrity portraits for TV Guide. Santore died on August 11, 2019.

== Background ==
Santore was born in Philadelphia in 1935 and attended the Museum School of Art (which is now the University of the Arts) where he studied illustration. When he graduated in 1956, he served in the Army and then returned to Philadelphia to work in a small art studio. He started to get assignments from the N.W. Ayer Agency and his first editorial assignment was for the old Saturday Evening Post headquartered in Philadelphia.

== Career beginnings ==
In 1985, he was approached by Running Press to illustrate a new version of "Tales of Peter Rabbit" by Beatrix Potter. It was a life-changing experience as he realized how different it was to illustrate an entire book rather than just one image.

== Personal life ==
Santore married Olenka (née Litynski) in 1963. Together, their Philadelphia home featured a collection of early American folk paintings. Santore died in 2019 at the age of 84; he was predeceased by his wife four months earlier. The couple were survived by their daughter, two sons, and three grandchildren.

== Books ==
Santore spent about two years illustrating most of his books, including those by other authors. His work appeared in publications such as Redbook, Ladies' Home Journal, Esquire, Cosmopolitan, National Geographic, and many others. His most popular works were celebrity portraits he did for TV Guide magazine covers.

As writer and illustrator

- William the Curious: Knight of the Water Lilies (1997)
- A Stowaway on Noah's Ark (2001)
- Three Hungry Pigs and the Wolf Who Came to Dinner (2005)
- The Silk Princess (2007)

As illustrator

- The Classic Tale of Peter Rabbit and Other Cherished Stories by Beatrix Potter (1986)
- Aesop's Fables (1988)
- The Wizard of Oz by L. Frank Baum (1991)
- The Little Mermaid by Hans Christian Andersen (1993)
- Paul Revere's Ride by Henry Wadsworth Longfellow (1994)
- Snow White by the Brothers Grimm (1996)
- The Life and Adventures of Santa Claus by L. Frank Baum (2009)
- The Night Before Christmas by Clement C. Moore (2011)
- The Velveteen Rabbit by Margery Williams Bianco (2012)
- Alice's Adventures in Wonderland by Lewis Carroll (2017)

== Antique Authority ==
Santore was also a collector and authority on antiques, with particular focus on Windsor seating. He lectured and served as an advisor at universities and museums, including Yale University, University of Pennsylvania, and Mount Vernon, and served as a consultant for auction houses. His books The Windsor Style in America: A Pictorial Study of the History and Regional Characteristics of the Most Popular Furniture Form of Eighteenth-Century America, 1730-1830, 1981, and The Windsor Style in America, 1730-1840, volume two, 1987 are definitive resources.

== Permanent collections ==
His illustrations are part of the permanent collections at many locations including: the Brandywine River Museum of Art in Chadds Ford, Pennsylvania, the Free Library of Philadelphia, the Museum of Modern Art in New York City, The United States Department of the Interior, the Smithsonian National Portrait Gallery in Washington, D.C. and many private collections.

== Awards ==
- Hamilton King Award from the New York Society of Illustrators
- Gold medal from the New York Society of Publication Designers
- "Edgar" from the Mystery Writers of America
