= Special Operations Forces Liaison Element =

Small group of US special forces personnel attached to certain embassies

The logo of the United States Special Operations Command

The Special Operations Forces Liaison Element (SOFLE) is small group of special forces personnel, sometimes just one or two at a time, attached to embassies in Africa, Southeast Asia, South America, or elsewhere that terrorists are thought to be operating, planning attacks, raising money or seeking safe haven, especially those teams in the United States.

These units work to gather information on possible terror threats, but do not actively hunt down terrorists. In addition, MLEs are not undercover. SOCOM, under then secretary of defense Donald Rumsfeld, first deployed MLEs in 2003 under the name "Operational Control Elements" a term changed in 2005 because it was considered inappropriate and unpolitic by regional commanders and ambassadors.

MLEs were first introduced to the general public by a New York Times expose.

== Taiwan ==
As of March 2024, U.S. defense officials have reportedly decided to expand the liaison element within Taiwan, as several teams of Green Berets with the 1st Special Forces Group, 2nd Battalion, Alpha Company will soon or have already arrived at amphibious bases used by the Taiwanese Army on the Islands of Penghu and Kinmen which is only roughly 6 miles from mainland China.

The Taiwanese Ministry of National Defense and the U.S. Department of Defense have refused to officially confirm or deny this deployment.
