= Wilson McLean =

Scottish illustrator and artist (born 1937)

Wilson McLean (born 1937) is a Scottish illustrator and artist. He has illustrated primarily in the field of advertising but has also provided cover art for music albums, stamps, sports magazines (including Sports Illustrated), a children's book and other commercial endeavors.

== Career ==
Wilson McLean began his career in a London silkscreen studio at fifteen years of age and, to date, has won most major illustrator awards in the United States. Born in Scotland, he moved to London at age ten and later attended St. Martins and the Central School at night, while working on magazines and in design studios. This exposed him to the work of American illustrators and painters and convinced him that he would eventually go to America. Two years of national service stopped him from painting. He then went back to the design studios in Fleet Street for a few years, whilst working on his drawings, outside of working hours.

At twenty-three, Wilson moved to Copenhagen and began a freelance career; he also married a Norwegian woman and after a year, they moved to Spain, then back to London, where he quickly established himself, working with publishing houses, advertising agencies and magazines.

In 1965, he went to New York for six weeks, to see if he could establish himself. In the first week, an agent took him on and he got his first commission from The Saturday Evening Post, which he did in a borrowed studio; that was followed by three more magazine jobs, which he completed in London.

Returning in 1966 with his wife and child, he moved to the Upper West Side, thinking this would continue as before, but although this was a very creative time in New York and there was no shortage of work in general, McLean experienced several lean years before gaining a reputation. He realized he did not yet have a signature style and point of view, and competition was fierce, so after a couple of years or so experimenting with different mediums and observing more concept-oriented pictures, he accomplished a breakthrough in 1973 with important work for Look Magazine, Sports Illustrated and Playboy.

His diligence paid off and he worked for various of clients from advertising, movie posters, record covers, Time Magazine covers, book jackets, annual reports, etc. McLean's awards include several silver and gold medals at the Art Directors Club of New York, plus the prestigious Clio for television commercials for Eastern Airlines. He won nine silver and four gold medals at the Society of Illustrators in New York and in 1980 he won the Hamilton King Award for best in show and gold at the Los Angeles Art Directors Show.

The Society of Illustrators Gallery in New York gave him a one-man show in 1978 and he later went to Zürich for two summers running to work on lithographs, ending in an exhibition of his work there in 1984. During the years, he has participated in group shows in New York and other parts of the country. He is represented at the National Portrait Gallery at the Smithsonian Institution in Washington, D.C., the National Air and Space Museum in D.C. and the London Transport Museum’s permanent poster collection.

In 1985, to commemorate European Music Year, the Royal Mail commissioned him to design and illustrate five stamps for a special edition of British composers and he designed a set of four stamps for the United States Postal Service, illustrating the Broadway musical Oklahoma! around the same time.

McLean contributed to an exhibition curated by Charlotte Bralds, in 1992, for the United Nations Environmental Programme in cooperation with Earth Island Institute and the Society of Illustrators entitled Art for Survival. A book was also created, Art for Survival: the illustrator and the environment.

In 1998, a children's book called If The Earth.. were a few feet in diameter was published by the Greenwich Workshop Press featuring eighteen paintings.

To celebrate the millennium, Royal Mail commissioned Wilson McLean to illustrate a stamp. It was part of a series called The Settler's Tale, the theme being migration. It depicted the Puritans' ship, The Mayflower. Other stamps in the series were created by artists such as Gary Powell and John Byrne.

In 2007, McLean had a show of work at the John Davis Gallery in Hudson, New York. In 2009, there was a show of Italian landscapes at the Conrad L. Mallett Gallery in Hartford, Connecticut. The Society of Illustrators in 2010 inducted McLean into the Hall of Fame. In 2011, McLean designed and painted the Earth Day poster, which the State Department in Washington, D.C. produces yearly.

== Marriage ==
In 1974, he met and later married Rosemary Howard, an ex-model turned photographer. They shared a loft/studio in the Flatiron District of Manhattan and split their time between Southampton and New York.

In 2000 he and his wife moved to Hudson, New York from Long Island and Manhattan. Mclean now lives full-time in Hurley, New York.

== Teaching ==
His teaching has included Syracuse University, The School of Visual Arts, guest workshops at Savannah College of Art and Design, Ringling College of Art and Design in Florida, and workshops throughout the United States.
