= Jim Shea =

Jim Shea may refer to:

- Jimmy Shea (born 1968), American skeleton racer
- Jim Shea, Sr. (born 1938), Nordic skier at the 1964 Winter Olympics
- Jim Shea (judge) (born 1966), Montana Supreme Court judge
- H. James Shea Jr. (1939–1970), Massachusetts state representative and anti-Vietnam War activist

== See also ==
- James Shea (born 1991), English footballer
