= James Sharpe (historian) =

English social historian (1946-2024)

James Anthony Sharpe, FRHS (9 October 1946 – 13 February 2024) was an English social historian who was a professor emeritus of early modern history at the University of York. He was a specialist in witchcraft, and crime and punishment, in early modern England.

Sharpe earned his BA and DPhil at the University of Oxford and joined the University of York as a lecturer in 1973. He became professor in 1997 and retired in 2016.

Sharpe died on 13 February 2024, at the age of 77.

== Selected publications ==
- Crime in Seventeenth-Century England. Cambridge University Press/Past and Present Publications, 1983.
- "William Holcroft his Booke": Office Holding in Late Stuart Essex. Essex Record Office, Essex Historical Documents, 2, 1986.
- Crime and the Law in English Satirical Prints 1600 - 1832. Chadwyck - Healey, 1986.
- Judicial Punishment in England. Faber and Faber, 1990.
- Early Modern England: a Social History 1550 - 1760. Edward Arnold, 1987: 2nd edn., 1997.
- Instruments of Darkness: Witchcraft in England 1550 - 1750. Hamish Hamilton, 1996.
- Crime in Early Modern England 1550 - 1750. Longman, 1984: 2nd edn., 1998.
- The Bewitching of Anne Gunter: A horrible and true story of deception, witchcraft, murder and the King of England. Profile Books, 2000.
- Witchcraft in Early Modern England. Longmans, 2001: 2nd edn., 2019. Seminar Studies in History series.
- Dick Turpin: The Myth of the English Highwayman. Profile Books, 2004.
- A Fiery & Furious People. Random House, 2016. ISBN 9781847945136
