= Tony Costa =

American serial killer (1944-1974)

- Costa c. 1970
- Born: Antone Charles Costa; August 2, 1944; Cambridge, Massachusetts, U.S.
- Died: May 12, 1974 (aged 29); MCI-Walpole, Massachusetts, U.S.
- Other name: The Cape Cod Vampire
- Conviction: Murder (x2)
- Penalty: Life imprisonment

Details
- Victims: 4–8+ (2 convicted)
- Span of crimes: 1968–1969
- Country: United States
- State: Massachusetts
- Date apprehended: March 6, 1969

Antone Charles "Tony" Costa (August 2, 1944 – May 12, 1974), sometimes referred to as the Cape Cod Vampire or the Cape Cod Cannibal (Note: Initial reports of toothmarks found on victims' bodies were later proven false, as were claims made about cannibalism.) was an American serial killer who was active in and around the town of Truro, Massachusetts, during 1968 and 1969. The dismembered remains of four women were found in or near a forest clearing where Costa grew marijuana. His crimes gained international media attention when a district attorney falsely alluded to them involving cannibalism.

== Early life and crimes ==
Tony Costa was born in Cambridge, Massachusetts, on August 2, 1944. He committed his first violent offense in November 1961 at age 17, when he broke into a house and attacked the occupant, a teenaged girl. He was charged with burglary and assault, and sentenced to three years' probation and a one-year suspended sentence.

Costa was married in 1963 and had three children, but the marriage dissolved over his drug use and he left for California in 1966. In the summer of 1968, Costa returned to Massachusetts where he stole thousands of dollars of medical equipment.

== Killings and media attention ==
On February 8, 1969, a search was organized for two missing women, Patricia Walsh and Mary Anne Wysocki, which was launched at a woods where Walsh's Volkswagen van (Note: In Vonnegut's account the "pale-blue VW bug" (not van), reportedly seen near Costa's marijuana patch (of two plants), was found in storage in Burlington, Vermont.) had been abandoned. During the search, police discovered the remains of Susan Perry, who had been missing since the previous Labor Day (September 1968). Perry's body had been cut into eight pieces. About a month later, parts of Wysocki's body were found, then Walsh and the rest of Wysocki's body were found in a forest clearing. The latter two women had been mutilated with a knife and apparently died of gunshot wounds to the head. Beneath these remains, police found the dismembered body of Sydney Monzon. The bodies showed signs of necrophilia.

Police knew that the clearing where the bodies were found was used by Costa for growing marijuana, making him their main suspect. Costa knew the four women, who had all disappeared following his return to Truro, and his fingerprints were on the torn cover of the Volkwagen's owner's manual, which was found in the woods.

The case gained international attention when district attorney Edmund Dinis, in comments to the media, claimed of Walsh and Wysocki, "The hearts of each girl had been removed from the bodies and were not in the graves ... Each body was cut into as many parts as there are joints." Dinis also claimed that there were toothmarks found on the bodies. These claims, although untrue, drew national and international media outlets to Provincetown, Massachusetts.

Kurt Vonnegut (whose daughter, Edith, had met Costa) compared Costa to Jack the Ripper in an article in the July 25, 1969, issue of Life Magazine, which was included in his collection of essays, Wampeters, Foma and Granfalloons. Vonnegut maintained a correspondence with Costa. The author said, "The message of his letters to me was that a person as intent on being virtuous as he could not possibly have hurt a fly. He believed it."

=== Other cases ===
Costa was considered as a potential suspect in the deaths of 16 women on the west Coast of the United States. This included Bonnie Williams and Diane Federoff, hitchhikers he had picked up while crossing the country in 1966, and his girlfriend in San Francisco, Barbara Spaulding. However, all three women were later found alive.

== Trial and imprisonment ==
On June 12, 1969, Costa was arraigned on charges of murder for three of the deaths. In May 1970, he was convicted for the murders of Wysocki and Walsh and sentenced to life in prison at Massachusetts' Walpole Correctional Institution. On May 12, 1974, Costa died from an apparent suicide by hanging in his cell, though this was later questioned as a possible murder.

=== Costa's account ===
Costa described the murders of Walsh and Wysocki in his unpublished novel, Resurrection, written while he was in prison. In his account, Costa and a friend identified by the pseudonym "Carl" were consuming LSD and Dilaudid with the two women. Carl then shot Walsh and Wysocki. Costa claimed he was able to subdue his friend, and upon realizing that Wysocki was still alive, used a knife to end her suffering. According to Costa, he and Carl then buried the bodies. The novel also describes the deaths of Susan Perry and Sydney Monzon as being due to drug overdoses. Costa claims it was Carl who dismembered and buried their bodies, and that he had no knowledge of it until after their deaths.

== In popular culture ==
The case inspired the 1981 true-crime book In His Garden: The Anatomy of a Murderer by Leo Damore, which took its title from Costa's marijuana garden.

The 1984 Norman Mailer novel Tough Guys Don't Dance is based on Costa's crimes.

In 2021, Liza Rodman co-wrote the book The Babysitter: My Summers with a Serial Killer, about her encounters with Costa during her childhood. Before the murders, he was her babysitter during summer breaks.

The case was covered by the popular true-crime TV show, Born to Kill?, in season six. The episode aired on television in 2014.
