= Don Weller (painter) =

American painter

Don Weller is an American illustrator and painter.

== Background ==
Weller grew up in Pullman, Washington and loved drawing from an early age. He started at Washington State University in their veterinary pre-med program but switched to art after two years. In 1960, after graduating, he moved to Los Angeles. His freelance work was very popular and he had work in three children's books and on five U.S. stamps.

== Career ==
He did covers for Time and TV Guide, and illustrated stories in Sports Illustrated, Boys' Life, Pro and Reader's Digest. He designed posters for the NFL, Hollywood Bowl, and 1984 Los Angeles Olympics. He has taught at UCLA and the Art Center in Pasadena. Weller previously served as president for the Society of Illustrators of Los Angeles.

In 1984, he and his wife, Cha Cha, moved to Park City, Utah. He became interesting in riding cutting horses and started painting horses and cowboys at that time. In 2016, the Kimball Art Center had an exhibit called "Don Weller: Another Cowboy" which included 90 Western watercolors.

As of 2006, he lives in a farm in Utah with his wife and their animals, where he paints pictures of cowboys and related subjects, and breeds and competes cutting horses.

Because of declining eyesight, he has turned to writing mystery novels set in Summit County, Utah. His first novel, Snap Chance, was published in 2022, and features the cutting horses he so admires.

== Awards and honors ==
The America's Horse in Art Show & Sale announced that Weller would be the signature artist for their 11th annual show in August 2018.
