= Real People (TV program) =

- Cast photo from left to right: Bill Rafferty (Bottom Left), John Barbour (Top Left), Sarah Purcell (Middle), Skip Stephenson (Top Middle) and Byron Allen (Top Right)
- Genre: Reality
- Directed by: Dave Caldwell
- Starring: John Barbour; Sarah Purcell; Byron Allen; Skip Stephenson; Bill Rafferty; Mark Russell; David Ruprecht; Peter Billingsley; Fred Willard
- Narrated by: Jack Harrell
- Country of origin: United States
- Original language: English
- No. of seasons: 5

Production
- Executive producer: George Schlatter
- Producers: Bob Wynn; John Barbour
- Production companies: George Schlatter Productions; NBC

Original release
- Network: NBC
- Release: April 18, 1979 – July 4, 1984

Real People is an American reality television series that originally aired on NBC from 1979 to 1984, Wednesdays from 8 pm to 9 pm Eastern Time. Its initial episodes aired live in the Eastern and Central time zones. Real People featured "real people" (as opposed to celebrities) with unique occupations or hobbies.

== Synopsis ==
Real People featured a panel of seated hosts in front of a large studio audience. The hosts introduced pre-filmed segments and engaged in comedic banter about them. Each segment was a visit to someone with a unique occupation or hobby. Segments tended to emphasize gross-out humor more often than not. Occasionally, someone was brought into the studio to interact with the audience.

In its early seasons, Real People was NBC's most popular series, often scoring at the top of the ratings, and was a rare hit for the network at a time when NBC was a distant third in the ratings and struggling with numerous flops. Segments included "funny pictures" and funny newspaper errors sent by viewers, who then were awarded a Real People T-shirt.

Regular hosts included John Barbour, Sarah Purcell, Byron Allen, Skip Stephenson, Bill Rafferty, Mark Russell, Peter Billingsley, David Ruprecht, and Fred Willard.

The success of Real People led to a batch of imitators, the best known and longest-running of which was That's Incredible! which aired on ABC, and That's My Line on CBS, hosted by Bob Barker. Real People gave fitness instructor Richard Simmons his major break into the mass media and spotlighted unique talents such as Pittsburgh Police traffic cop Vic Cianca.

When repeats of the show were initially syndicated by Telepictures to broadcast stations, they were edited down to 30-minute segments and retitled More Real People.

In 1980, NBC launched two attempts at spin-offs: Speak Up, America and Real Kids. Speak Up, America starred former child televangelist Marjoe Gortner and basically expanded the opening segment of Real People (in which audience members were encouraged to sound off about any topics they wished) into a full hour program. Real Kids starred Peter Billingsley and a cast of child hosts in a format that mirrored Real People, but focused only on children. Both spin-off formats quickly failed, though Billingsley went on to join Real People as a recurring host and contributor.

A one-hour retrospective special aired on October 1, 1991, with hosts Sarah Purcell and Fred Willard.

== Ratings ==
Season	Rank	Rating
1978–79	—N/a	—N/a
1979–80	14	22.1 (Tied with House Calls)
1980–81	12	21.5
1981–82	21	19.7
1982–83	30	17.2 (Tied with The Dukes of Hazzard)
1983–84	40	16.1
