= Sarah Purcell =

American game show host

Sarah Purcell Schulte
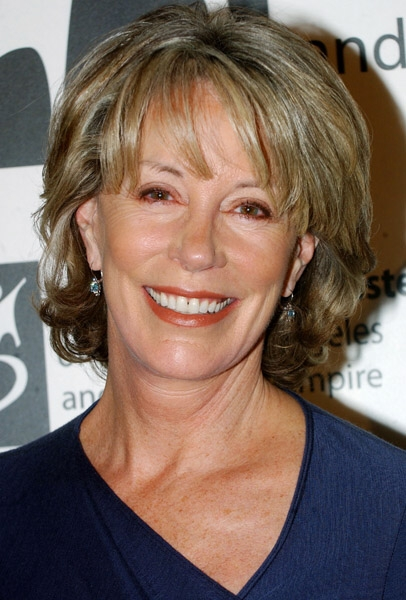
- Born: Sarah Pentecost; October 8, 1948 (age 77); Richmond, Indiana, U.S.
- Occupations: Talk show host Game show host
- Years active: 1975–1998
- Known for: Real People
- Spouse(s): Joe Purcell (m. 1970; div. 1979) Dr. Sandy McClintock (m. 1983; div. 2010) 2 children) Walter “Chip” Schulte (m. 2016)
- Children: 4

Sarah Purcell (born Sarah Pentecost on October 8, 1948, Richmond, Indiana) is an American former talk show host, game show host, and panelist.

She was co-host of The Better Sex (1977–1978), Real People (1979–1984), America (1985–1986), and ABC's Home (1992–1994) and made guest appearances on several TV dramas. She also co-starred in the 1981 TV movie Terror Among Us with Don Meredith and Tracy Reed. She has appeared in a number of infomercials for health foods, appliances, and skin-care products. She appeared in advertisements for the Tomy Tutor home computer in 1983.

From 1975 to 1978, she co-hosted A.M. Los Angeles on KABC-TV with Regis Philbin. In the early 1990s, Purcell was also a panelist on the game show To Tell the Truth.
