= Motion Picture and Television Photo Archive =

Film and television photo archive

The Motion Picture and Television Photo Archive (MPTV) is an archive collection of celebrity and entertainment photography founded by photographer and director Sid Avery. It currently contains over a million images by over 60 noted photographers and is one of the largest such archives in the world. MPTV licenses this material for publication and offers prints for sale.
