= List of accolades received by Star Wars films =

Star Wars is an American epic space opera media franchise created by George Lucas, which began with the eponymous 1977 film and quickly became a worldwide pop-culture phenomenon. The franchise has been expanded into various films and other media, including television series, video games, novels, comic books, theme park attractions, and themed areas, comprising an all-encompassing fictional universe. (Note: Most existing spin-off media was made non-canon and rebranded as 'Legends' in April 2014.) The franchise holds a Guinness World Records title for the "Most successful film merchandising franchise." In 2020, the Star Wars franchise's total value was estimated at US$70 billion, and it is currently the fifth-highest-grossing media franchise of all time.

The twelve live-action films together have been nominated for 37 Academy Awards, of which they have won seven. The films were also awarded a total of three Special Achievement Awards. The Empire Strikes Back and Return of the Jedi received Special Achievement Awards for their visual effects, and Star Wars received a Special Achievement Award for its alien, creature and robot voices.

The original film was nominated for most of the major categories, including Best Picture, Best Director, Best Original Screenplay, and Best Supporting Actor for Alec Guinness, while all sequels have been nominated for technical categories.

Star Wars has the most Saturn Awards (for a film franchise) with 49 wins.

Star Wars (1977) was originally nominated for 12 and won eight competitive awards; the actual number of wins includes five special non-competitive awards, which don't count toward nomination totals and were given out to reward the film's art direction, cinematography, editing, set decoration, and sound, respectively. In addition, the film received a special award in 1997 for its 20th anniversary.

Total Saturn Award wins for each Star Wars film includes:

14 (including 6 non-competitive) wins for Star Wars (1977), 4 wins for The Empire Strikes Back (1980), 5 wins for Return of the Jedi (1983), 2 wins for The Phantom Menace (1999), 2 wins for Attack of the Clones (2002), 1 win for Star Wars Trilogy (2004), a compilation comprising the franchise's first three installments, 2 wins for Revenge of the Sith (2005), 8 wins for The Force Awakens (2015), 3 wins for Rogue One (2016), 3 wins for The Last Jedi (2017), and 5 wins for Star Wars: The Rise of Skywalker (2019).

Music for Star Wars has earned composer John Williams most of the awards and nominations in his career:

1 Academy Awards (5 nominations), 1 Golden Globe Awards (1 nomination), 2 BAFTA Awards (2 nominations), 6 Grammy Awards (11 nominations), 3 Saturn Awards (4 nominations).

To the same John Williams' music to A New Hope is the only Golden Globe win for the Star Wars.

== Academy Awards ==
Year	Category	Film	Nominee(s)	Result	Ref.
1978	Best Picture	Star Wars: Episode IV – A New Hope	Gary Kurtz	Nominated	
1978	Best Director	Star Wars: Episode IV – A New Hope	George Lucas	Nominated	
1978	Best Supporting Actor	Star Wars: Episode IV – A New Hope	Alec Guinness	Nominated	
1978	Best Original Screenplay	Star Wars: Episode IV – A New Hope	George Lucas	Nominated	
1978	Best Art Direction	Star Wars: Episode IV – A New Hope	Art Direction: John Barry, Norman Reynolds and Leslie Dilley; Set Decoration: Roger Christian	Won	
1978	Best Costume Design	Star Wars: Episode IV – A New Hope	John Mollo	Won	
1978	Best Film Editing	Star Wars: Episode IV – A New Hope	Paul Hirsch, Marcia Lucas and Richard Chew	Won	
1978	Best Original Score	Star Wars: Episode IV – A New Hope	John Williams	Won	
1978	Best Sound	Star Wars: Episode IV – A New Hope	Don MacDougall, Ray West, Bob Minkler and Derek Ball	Won	
1978	Best Visual Effects	Star Wars: Episode IV – A New Hope	John Stears, John Dykstra, Richard Edlund, Grant McCune and Robert Blalack	Won	
1978	Special Achievement Awards	Star Wars: Episode IV – A New Hope	Ben Burtt for the creation of the alien, creature, and robot voices	Honoured	
1981	Best Original Score	Star Wars: Episode V – The Empire Strikes Back	John Williams	Nominated	
1981	Best Art Direction	Star Wars: Episode V – The Empire Strikes Back	Art Direction: Norman Reynolds, Leslie Dilley, Harry Lange and Alan Tomkins; Set Decoration: Michael Ford	Nominated	
1981	Best Sound	Star Wars: Episode V – The Empire Strikes Back	Bill Varney, Steve Maslow, Gregg Landaker and Peter Sutton	Won	
1981	Special Achievement Awards	Star Wars: Episode V – The Empire Strikes Back	Brian Johnson, Richard Edlund, Dennis Muren and Bruce Nicholson for Visual Effects	Honoured	
1984	Best Original Score	Star Wars: Episode VI – Return of the Jedi	John Williams	Nominated	
1984	Best Art Direction	Star Wars: Episode VI – Return of the Jedi	Art Direction: Norman Reynolds, Fred Hole and James L. Schoppe; Set Decoration: Michael D. Ford	Nominated	
1984	Best Sound	Star Wars: Episode VI – Return of the Jedi	Ben Burtt, Gary Summers, Randy Thom and Tony Dawe	Nominated	
1984	Best Sound Effects Editing	Star Wars: Episode VI – Return of the Jedi	Ben Burtt	Nominated	
1984	Special Achievement Awards	Star Wars: Episode VI – Return of the Jedi	Richard Edlund, Dennis Muren, Ken Ralston and Phil Tippett for Visual Effects	Honoured	
2000	Best Sound	Star Wars: Episode I – The Phantom Menace	Gary Rydstrom, Tom Johnson, Shawn Murphy and John Midgley	Nominated	
2000	Best Sound Effects Editing	Star Wars: Episode I – The Phantom Menace	Ben Burtt and Tom Bellfort	Nominated	
2000	Best Visual Effects	Star Wars: Episode I – The Phantom Menace	John Knoll, Dennis Muren, Scott Squires and Rob Coleman	Nominated	
2003	Best Visual Effects	Star Wars: Episode II – Attack of the Clones	Rob Coleman, Pablo Helman, John Knoll, and Ben Snow	Nominated	
2006	Best Makeup	Star Wars: Episode III – Revenge of the Sith	Dave Elsey and Nikki Gooley	Nominated	
2016	Best Film Editing	Star Wars: The Force Awakens	Maryann Brandon and Mary Jo Markey	Nominated	
2016	Best Original Score	Star Wars: The Force Awakens	John Williams	Nominated	
2016	Best Sound Mixing	Star Wars: The Force Awakens	Andy Nelson, Christopher Scarabosio and Stuart Wilson	Nominated	
2016	Best Sound Editing	Star Wars: The Force Awakens	Matthew Wood and David Acord	Nominated	
2016	Best Visual Effects	Star Wars: The Force Awakens	Chris Corbould, Roger Guyett, Patrick Tubach and Neal Scanlan	Nominated	
2017	Best Sound Mixing	Rogue One: A Star Wars Story	David Parker, Christopher Scarabosio and Stuart Wilson	Nominated	
2017	Best Visual Effects	Rogue One: A Star Wars Story	John Knoll, Mohen Leo, Hal Hickel and Neil Corbould	Nominated	
2018	Best Original Score	Star Wars: The Last Jedi	John Williams	Nominated	
2018	Best Sound Mixing	Star Wars: The Last Jedi	David Parker, Michael Semanick, Ren Klyce and Stuart Wilson	Nominated	
2018	Best Sound Editing	Star Wars: The Last Jedi	Matthew Wood and Ren Klyce	Nominated	
2018	Best Visual Effects	Star Wars: The Last Jedi	Ben Morris, Mike Mulholland, Neal Scanlan and Chris Corbould	Nominated	
2019	Best Visual Effects	Solo: A Star Wars Story	Rob Bredow, Patrick Tubach, Neal Scanlan and Dominic Tuohy	Nominated	
2020	Best Original Score	Star Wars: The Rise of Skywalker	John Williams	Nominated	
2020	Best Sound Editing	Star Wars: The Rise of Skywalker	Matthew Wood and David Acord	Nominated	
2020	Best Visual Effects	Star Wars: The Rise of Skywalker	Roger Guyett, Neal Scanlan, Patrick Tubach, and Dominic Tuohy	Nominated	

== Golden Globe Awards ==
Year	Category	Film	Nominee(s)	Result	Ref.
1978	Best Motion Picture – Drama	Star Wars: Episode IV – A New Hope	Gary Kurtz	Nominated	
1978	Best Director	Star Wars: Episode IV – A New Hope	George Lucas	Nominated	
1978	Best Supporting Actor	Star Wars: Episode IV – A New Hope	Alec Guinness	Nominated	
1978	Best Original Score	Star Wars: Episode IV – A New Hope	John Williams	Won	
1981	Best Original Score	Star Wars: Episode V – The Empire Strikes Back	John Williams	Nominated	

== BAFTA Awards ==
Year	Category	Film	Nominee(s)	Result	Ref.
1979	Best Film	Star Wars: Episode IV – A New Hope	Gary Kurtz	Nominated	
1979	Best Original Music	Star Wars: Episode IV – A New Hope	John Williams	Won	
1979	Best Costume Design	Star Wars: Episode IV – A New Hope	John Mollo	Nominated	
1979	Best Production Design	Star Wars: Episode IV – A New Hope	John Barry	Nominated	
1979	Best Editing	Star Wars: Episode IV – A New Hope	Paul Hirsch, Marcia Lucas and Richard Chew	Nominated	
1979	Best Sound	Star Wars: Episode IV – A New Hope	Sam Shaw, Robert Rutledge, Gordon Davidson, Gene Corso, Derek Ball, Don MacDougall, Bob Minkler, Ray West, Michael Minkler, Les Fresholtz, Richard Portman and Ben Burtt	Won	
1981	Best Original Music	Star Wars: Episode V – The Empire Strikes Back	John Williams	Won	
1981	Best Production Design	Star Wars: Episode V – The Empire Strikes Back	Norman Reynolds	Nominated	
1981	Best Sound	Star Wars: Episode V – The Empire Strikes Back	Peter Sutton, Ben Burtt and Bill Varney	Nominated	
1984	Best Special Visual Effects	Star Wars: Episode VI – Return of the Jedi	Richard Edlund, Dennis Muren, Ken Ralston and Kit West	Won	
1984	Best Makeup and Hair	Star Wars: Episode VI – Return of the Jedi	Phil Tippett and Stuart Freeborn	Nominated	
1984	Best Production Design	Star Wars: Episode VI – Return of the Jedi	Norman Reynolds	Nominated	
1984	Best Sound	Star Wars: Episode VI – Return of the Jedi	Ben Burtt, Tony Dawe and Gary Summers	Nominated	
2000	Best Special Visual Effects	Star Wars: Episode I – The Phantom Menace	John Knoll, Dennis Muren, Scott Squires and Rob Coleman	Nominated	
2000	Best Sound	Star Wars: Episode I – The Phantom Menace	Ben Burtt, Tom Bellfort, John Midgley, Gary Rydstrom, Tom Johnson and Shawn Murphy	Nominated	
2016	Best Original Music	Star Wars: The Force Awakens	John Williams	Nominated	
2016	Best Special Visual Effects	Star Wars: The Force Awakens	Chris Corbould, Roger Guyett, Paul Kavanagh, and Neal Scanlan	Won	
2016	Best Production Design	Star Wars: The Force Awakens	Rick Carter, Darren Gilford, and Lee Sandales	Nominated	
2016	Best Sound	Star Wars: The Force Awakens	David Acord, Andy Nelson, Christopher Scarabosio, Stuart Wilson, and Matthew Wood	Nominated	
2017	Best Special Visual Effects	Rogue One: A Star Wars Story	Neil Corbould, Hal Hickel, Mohen Leo, John Knoll, and Nigel Sumner	Nominated	
2017	Best Makeup and Hair	Rogue One: A Star Wars Story	Amanda Knight, Neal Scanlan, and Lisa Tomblin	Nominated	
2018	Best Special Visual Effects	Star Wars: The Last Jedi	Stephen Aplin, Chris Corbould, Ben Morris, and Neal Scanlan	Nominated	
2018	Best Sound	Star Wars: The Last Jedi	Ren Klyce, David Parker, Michael Semanick, Stuart Wilson, and Matthew Wood	Nominated	
2020	Best Original Score	Star Wars: The Rise of Skywalker	John Williams	Nominated	
2020	Best Special Visual Effects	Star Wars: The Rise of Skywalker	Roger Guyett, Paul Kavanagh, Neal Scanlan, and Dominic Tuohy	Nominated	
2020	Best Sound	Star Wars: The Rise of Skywalker	David Acord, Andy Nelson, Christopher Scarabosio, Stuart Wilson, and Matthew Wood	Nominated	

== Grammy Awards ==
Year	Category	Film	Soundtrack or theme	Nominee(s)	Result	Ref.
1978	Album of the Year	Star Wars: Episode IV – A New Hope	Star Wars: Episode IV – A New Hope	John Williams and London Symphony Orchestra	Nominated	
1978	Best Instrumental Composition	Star Wars: Episode IV – A New Hope	"Star Wars (Main Title)"	John Williams	Won	
1978	Best Original Score Written for a Motion Picture or a Television Special	Star Wars: Episode IV – A New Hope	Star Wars: Episode IV – A New Hope	John Williams	Won	
1978	Best Pop Instrumental Performance	Star Wars: Episode IV – A New Hope	Star Wars: Episode IV – A New Hope	John Williams	Won	
1981	Best Album of Original Score Written for a Motion Picture or a Television Special	Star Wars: Episode V – The Empire Strikes Back	Star Wars: Episode V – The Empire Strikes Back	John Williams	Won	
1981	Best Instrumental Composition	Star Wars: Episode V – The Empire Strikes Back	Star Wars: Episode V – The Empire Strikes Back	John Williams	Won	
1981	Best Instrumental Composition	Star Wars: Episode V – The Empire Strikes Back	"The Imperial March (Darth Vader's Theme)"	John Williams	Nominated	
1981	Best Instrumental Composition	Star Wars: Episode V – The Empire Strikes Back	"Yoda's Theme"	John Williams	Nominated	
1981	Best Pop Instrumental Performance	Star Wars: Episode V – The Empire Strikes Back	"Yoda's Theme"	John Williams and London Symphony Orchestra	Nominated	
1984	Best Album of Original Score Written for a Motion Picture or A Television Special	Star Wars: Episode VI – Return of the Jedi	Star Wars Episode VI: Return of the Jedi	John Williams	Nominated	
2000	Best Instrumental Composition Written for a Motion Picture, Television or Other Visual Media	Star Wars: Episode I – The Phantom Menace	Star Wars: Episode I – The Phantom Menace	John Williams	Nominated	
2006	Best Score Soundtrack Album for a Motion Picture, Television or Other Visual Media	Star Wars: Episode III – Revenge of the Sith	Star Wars: Episode III – Revenge of the Sith	John Williams	Nominated	
2006	Best Instrumental Composition	Star Wars: Episode III – Revenge of the Sith	"Anakin's Betrayal"	John Williams	Nominated	
2017	Best Score Soundtrack for Visual Media	Star Wars: The Force Awakens	Star Wars: The Force Awakens	John Williams	Won	
2019	Best Score Soundtrack for Visual Media	Star Wars: The Last Jedi	Star Wars: The Last Jedi	John Williams	Nominated	
2019	Best Instrumental Composition	Solo: A Star Wars Story	"Mine Mission"	John Powell & John Williams	Nominated	
2021	Best Score Soundtrack for Visual Media	Star Wars: The Rise of Skywalker	Star Wars: The Rise of Skywalker	John Williams	Nominated	

== Saturn Awards ==
Year	Category	Film	Nominee(s)	Result	Ref.
1978	Best Science Fiction Film	Star Wars: Episode IV – A New Hope	Gary Kurtz	Won	
1978	Best Director	Star Wars: Episode IV – A New Hope	George Lucas	Won (Note: Tied with Steven Spielberg for Close Encounters of the Third Kind.)	
1978	Best Writing	Star Wars: Episode IV – A New Hope	George Lucas	Won	
1978	Best Actor	Star Wars: Episode IV – A New Hope	Harrison Ford	Nominated	
1978	Best Actor	Star Wars: Episode IV – A New Hope	Mark Hamill	Nominated	
1978	Best Actress	Star Wars: Episode IV – A New Hope	Carrie Fisher	Nominated	
1978	Best Supporting Actor	Star Wars: Episode IV – A New Hope	Alec Guinness	Won	
1978	Best Supporting Actor	Star Wars: Episode IV – A New Hope	Peter Cushing	Nominated	
1978	Best Music	Star Wars: Episode IV – A New Hope	John Williams	Won (Note: Tied with himself for Close Encounters of the Third Kind.)	
1978	Best Costumes	Star Wars: Episode IV – A New Hope	John Mollo	Won	
1978	Best Make-up	Star Wars: Episode IV – A New Hope	Rick Baker, Stuart Freeborn	Won	
1978	Best Special Effects	Star Wars: Episode IV – A New Hope	John Dykstra, John Stears	Won	
1978	Best Art Direction	Star Wars: Episode IV – A New Hope	Norman Reynolds, Leslie Dilley	Honoured	
1978	Best Set Decoration	Star Wars: Episode IV – A New Hope	Roger Christian	Honoured	
1978	Special Award for Outstanding Cinematographer	Star Wars: Episode IV – A New Hope	Gilbert Taylor	Honoured	
1978	Best Editing	Star Wars: Episode IV – A New Hope	Paul Hirsch, Marcia Lucas, Richard Chew	Honoured	
1978	Best Sound	Star Wars: Episode IV – A New Hope	Ben Burtt, Don MacDougall	Honoured	
1981	Best Science Fiction Film	Star Wars: Episode V – The Empire Strikes Back	Gary Kurtz	Won	
1981	Best Director	Star Wars: Episode V – The Empire Strikes Back	Irvin Kershner	Won	
1981	Best Writing	Star Wars: Episode V – The Empire Strikes Back	Leigh Brackett, Lawrence Kasdan	Nominated	
1981	Best Actor	Star Wars: Episode V – The Empire Strikes Back	Mark Hamill	Won	
1981	Best Supporting Actor	Star Wars: Episode V – The Empire Strikes Back	Billy Dee Williams	Nominated	
1981	Best Costumes	Star Wars: Episode V – The Empire Strikes Back	John Mollo	Nominated	
1981	Best Music	Star Wars: Episode V – The Empire Strikes Back	John Williams	Nominated	
1981	Best Special Effects	Star Wars: Episode V – The Empire Strikes Back	Brian Johnson and Richard Edlund	Won	
1984	Best Science Fiction Film	Star Wars: Episode VI – Return of the Jedi	Howard Kazanjian	Won	
1984	Best Director	Star Wars: Episode VI – Return of the Jedi	Richard Marquand	Nominated	
1984	Best Writing	Star Wars: Episode VI – Return of the Jedi	Lawrence Kasdan, George Lucas	Nominated	
1984	Best Actor	Star Wars: Episode VI – Return of the Jedi	Mark Hamill	Won	
1984	Best Actress	Star Wars: Episode VI – Return of the Jedi	Carrie Fisher	Nominated	
1984	Best Supporting Actor	Star Wars: Episode VI – Return of the Jedi	Billy Dee Williams	Nominated	
1984	Best Music	Star Wars: Episode VI – Return of the Jedi	John Williams	Nominated	
1984	Best Costume	Star Wars: Episode VI – Return of the Jedi	Aggie Guerard Rodgers and Nilo Rodis-Jamero	Won	
1984	Best Make-up	Star Wars: Episode VI – Return of the Jedi	Phil Tippett and Stuart Freeborn	Won	
1984	Best Special Effects	Star Wars: Episode VI – Return of the Jedi	Richard Edlund, Dennis Muren, and Ken Ralston	Won	
1997	Special Award	Star Wars: Episode IV – A New Hope – For its 20th anniversary.		Honoured	
2000	Best Science Fiction Film	Star Wars: Episode I – The Phantom Menace	Rick McCallum	Nominated	
2000	Best Director	Star Wars: Episode I – The Phantom Menace	George Lucas	Nominated	
2000	Best Actor	Star Wars: Episode I – The Phantom Menace	Liam Neeson	Nominated	
2000	Best Supporting Actor	Star Wars: Episode I – The Phantom Menace	Ewan McGregor	Nominated	
2000	Best Supporting Actress	Star Wars: Episode I – The Phantom Menace	Pernilla August	Nominated	
2000	Best Young Actor/Actress	Star Wars: Episode I – The Phantom Menace	Jake Lloyd	Nominated	
2000	Best Young Actor/Actress	Star Wars: Episode I – The Phantom Menace	Natalie Portman	Nominated	
2000	Best Costumes	Star Wars: Episode I – The Phantom Menace	Trisha Biggar	Won	
2000	Best Make-Up	Star Wars: Episode I – The Phantom Menace	Paul Engelen, Sue Love and Nick Dudman	Nominated	
2000	Best Special Effects	Star Wars: Episode I – The Phantom Menace	Rob Coleman, John Knoll, Dennis Muren, Scott Squires	Won	
2002	Best DVD Classic Film Release	Star Wars: Episode I – The Phantom Menace		Nominated	
2002	Cinescape Genre Face of the Future Award	Star Wars: Episode II – Attack of the Clones	Hayden Christensen	Nominated	
2003	Best Science Fiction Film	Star Wars: Episode II – Attack of the Clones	Rick McCallum	Nominated	
2003	Best Director	Star Wars: Episode II – Attack of the Clones	George Lucas	Nominated	
2003	Best Actress	Star Wars: Episode II – Attack of the Clones	Natalie Portman	Nominated	
2003	Best Young Actor/Actress	Star Wars: Episode II – Attack of the Clones	Hayden Christensen	Nominated	
2003	Best Music	Star Wars: Episode II – Attack of the Clones	John Williams	Nominated	
2003	Best Costumes	Star Wars: Episode II – Attack of the Clones	Trisha Biggar	Won (Note: Tied with Ngila Dickson and Richard Taylor for The Lord of the Rings: The Two Towers.)	
2003	Best Special Effects	Star Wars: Episode II – Attack of the Clones	Rob Coleman, Pablo Helman, John Knoll, Ben Snow	Won	
2003	Best Special Edition DVD Release	Star Wars: Episode II – Attack of the Clones		Nominated	
2005	Best DVD Movie Collection	The Star Wars Trilogy (Note: the original trilogy.) (Episode IV – A New Hope, Episode V – The Empire Strikes Back, Episode VI – Return of the Jedi)		Won	
2006	Best Science Fiction Film	Star Wars: Episode III – Revenge of the Sith	Rick McCallum	Won	
2006	Best Director	Star Wars: Episode III – Revenge of the Sith	George Lucas	Nominated	
2006	Best Writing	Star Wars: Episode III – Revenge of the Sith	George Lucas	Nominated	
2006	Best Actor	Star Wars: Episode III – Revenge of the Sith	Hayden Christensen	Nominated	
2006	Best Actress	Star Wars: Episode III – Revenge of the Sith	Natalie Portman	Nominated	
2006	Best Supporting Actor	Star Wars: Episode III – Revenge of the Sith	Ian McDiarmid	Nominated	
2006	Best Music	Star Wars: Episode III – Revenge of the Sith	John Williams	Won	
2006	Best Costumes	Star Wars: Episode III – Revenge of the Sith	Trisha Biggar	Nominated	
2006	Best Make-Up	Star Wars: Episode III – Revenge of the Sith	Dave Elsey, Lou Elsey, Nikki Gooley	Nominated	
2006	Best Special Effects	Star Wars: Episode III – Revenge of the Sith	John Knoll, Roger Guyett, Rob Coleman, Brian Gernand	Nominated	
2009	Best Animated Film	Star Wars: The Clone Wars	Catherine Winder	Nominated	
2012	Best DVD Collection	Star Wars: The Complete Saga (Episode IV – A New Hope, Episode V – The Empire Strikes Back, Episode VI – Return of the Jedi, Episode I – The Phantom Menace, Episode II – Attack of the Clones and Episode III – Revenge of the Sith)		Nominated	
2016	Best Science Fiction Film	Star Wars: The Force Awakens	Kathleen Kennedy, J. J. Abrams, Bryan Burk	Won	
2016	Best Director	Star Wars: The Force Awakens	J. J. Abrams	Nominated	
2016	Best Writing	Star Wars: The Force Awakens	Lawrence Kasdan, J. J. Abrams, and Michael Arndt	Won	
2016	Best Actor	Star Wars: The Force Awakens	Harrison Ford	Won	
2016	Best Actress	Star Wars: The Force Awakens	Daisy Ridley	Nominated	
2016	Best Supporting Actor	Star Wars: The Force Awakens	John Boyega	Nominated	
2016	Best Supporting Actor	Star Wars: The Force Awakens	Adam Driver	Won	
2016	Best Supporting Actress	Star Wars: The Force Awakens	Carrie Fisher	Nominated	
2016	Best Supporting Actress	Star Wars: The Force Awakens	Lupita Nyong'o	Nominated	
2016	Best Music	Star Wars: The Force Awakens	John Williams	Won	
2016	Best Editing	Star Wars: The Force Awakens	Maryann Brandon and Mary Jo Markey	Won	
2016	Best Costume Design	Star Wars: The Force Awakens	Michael Kaplan	Nominated	
2016	Best Production Design	Star Wars: The Force Awakens	Rick Carter and Darren Gilford	Nominated	
2016	Best Make-up	Star Wars: The Force Awakens	Neal Scanlan	Won	
2016	Best Special Effects	Star Wars: The Force Awakens	Roger Guyett, Patrick Tubach, Neal Scanlan and Chris Corbould	Won	
2017	Best Science Fiction Film	Rogue One: A Star Wars Story	Kathleen Kennedy, Allison Shearmur, Simon Emanuel	Won	
2017	Best Director	Rogue One: A Star Wars Story	Gareth Edwards	Won	
2017	Best Writing	Rogue One: A Star Wars Story	Chris Weitz and Tony Gilroy	Nominated	
2017	Best Actress	Rogue One: A Star Wars Story	Felicity Jones	Nominated	
2017	Best Supporting Actor	Rogue One: A Star Wars Story	Diego Luna	Nominated	
2017	Best Music	Rogue One: A Star Wars Story	Michael Giacchino	Nominated	
2017	Best Editing	Rogue One: A Star Wars Story	John Gilroy, Colin Goudie, and Jabez Olssen	Nominated	
2017	Best Costume Design	Rogue One: A Star Wars Story	David Crossman and Glyn Dillon	Nominated	
2017	Best Production Design	Rogue One: A Star Wars Story	Doug Chiang and Neil Lamont	Nominated	
2017	Best Make-up	Rogue One: A Star Wars Story	Amy Byrne	Nominated	
2017	Best Special Effects	Rogue One: A Star Wars Story	John Knoll, Mohen Leo, Hal Hickel, and Neil Corbould	Won	
2018	Best Science Fiction Film	Star Wars: The Last Jedi	Kathleen Kennedy, Ram Bergman	Nominated	
2018	Best Director	Star Wars: The Last Jedi	Rian Johnson	Nominated	
2018	Best Writing	Star Wars: The Last Jedi	Rian Johnson	Won	
2018	Best Actor	Star Wars: The Last Jedi	Mark Hamill	Won	
2018	Best Actress	Star Wars: The Last Jedi	Daisy Ridley	Nominated	
2018	Best Supporting Actress	Star Wars: The Last Jedi	Carrie Fisher	Nominated	
2018	Best Supporting Actress	Star Wars: The Last Jedi	Kelly Marie Tran	Nominated	
2018	Best Music	Star Wars: The Last Jedi	John Williams	Nominated	
2018	Best Editing	Star Wars: The Last Jedi	Bob Ducsay	Won	
2018	Best Costume Design	Star Wars: The Last Jedi	Michael Kaplan	Nominated	
2018	Best Production Design	Star Wars: The Last Jedi	Rick Heinrichs	Nominated	
2018	Best Make-up	Star Wars: The Last Jedi	Peter Swords King and Neal Scanlan	Nominated	
2018	Best Special Effects	Star Wars: The Last Jedi	Ben Morris, Mike Mulholland, Chris Corbould, and Neal Scanlan	Nominated	
2019	Best Science Fiction Film	Solo: A Star Wars Story	Kathleen Kennedy, Allison Shearmur, Simon Emanuel	Nominated	
2021	Best Science Fiction Film	Star Wars: The Rise of Skywalker	Kathleen Kennedy, J. J. Abrams, Michelle Rejwan	Won	
2021	Best Director	Star Wars: The Rise of Skywalker	J. J. Abrams	Won	
2021	Best Writing	Star Wars: The Rise of Skywalker	J. J. Abrams and Chris Terrio	Nominated	
2021	Best Actress	Star Wars: The Rise of Skywalker	Daisy Ridley	Nominated	
2021	Best Supporting Actor	Star Wars: The Rise of Skywalker	Adam Driver	Nominated	
2021	Best Supporting Actor	Star Wars: The Rise of Skywalker	Ian McDiarmid	Nominated	
2021	Best Editing	Star Wars: The Rise of Skywalker	Maryann Brandon and Stefan Grube	Nominated	
2021	Best Music	Star Wars: The Rise of Skywalker	John Williams	Won	
2021	Best Production Design	Star Wars: The Rise of Skywalker	Rick Carter and Kevin Jenkins	Nominated	
2021	Best Costume Design	Star Wars: The Rise of Skywalker	Michael Kaplan	Nominated	
2021	Best Makeup	Star Wars: The Rise of Skywalker	Amanda Knight and Neal Scanlan	Won	
2021	Best Special Effects	Star Wars: The Rise of Skywalker	Roger Guyett, Neal Scanlan, Patrick Tubach and Dominic Tuohy	Won	

== Hugo Award ==
Year	Category	Film	Nominee(s)	Result	Ref.
1978	Best Dramatic Presentation	Star Wars: Episode IV – A New Hope	George Lucas (director, screenplay)	Won	
1981	Best Dramatic Presentation	Star Wars: Episode V – The Empire Strikes Back	Irvin Kershner (director), Leigh Bracket (screenplay), Lawrence Kasdan (screenplay), George Lucas (story)	Won	
1984	Best Dramatic Presentation	Star Wars: Episode VI – Return of the Jedi	Richard Marquand (director), Lawrence Kasdan (screenplay), George Lucas (screenplay, story)	Won	
2016	Best Dramatic Presentation (Long Form)	Star Wars: The Force Awakens	J. J. Abrams (director, screenplay), Lawrence Kasdan (screenplay), Michael Arndt (screenplay)	Nominated	
2017	Best Dramatic Presentation (Long Form)	Rogue One: A Star Wars Story	Gareth Edwards (director), Chris Weitz (screenplay), Tony Gilroy (screenplay)	Nominated	
2018	Best Dramatic Presentation (Long Form)	Star Wars: The Last Jedi	Rian Johnson (director, screenplay)	Nominated	
2020	Best Dramatic Presentation (Long Form)	Star Wars: The Rise of Skywalker	J. J. Abrams (director, screenplay), Chris Terrio (screenplay)	Nominated	
