= Norman Reynolds =

British production designer (1934–2023)

- Born: 26 March 1934; Willesden, London, England
- Died: 2 April 2023 (aged 89)
- Occupation(s): Production designer, art director
- Years active: 1962–1999
- Spouse: Ann Reynolds
- Children: 3

Norman William Reynolds (26 March 1934 – 2 April 2023) was a British production designer and art director, best known for his work on the original Star Wars trilogy and Raiders of the Lost Ark.

== Early life and education ==
Reynolds was born in Willesden, London on 26 March 1934, Reynolds went to art college.

== Career ==
Reynolds was working for a manufacturer of illuminated signs when he was commissioned to create signs for the 1962 film The Road to Hong Kong and decided to apply for jobs in film design. He started work at Elstree Studios in 1963 as a designer on Come Fly with Me, then worked on the TV series The Saint and on 1965's Thunderball. Subsequent work included Battle of Britain (1969; uncredited) and as assistant art director on Phase IV (1974).

Reynolds did his best known work on the first three Star Wars films, as art director on 1977's Star Wars and after the death of John Barry as production designer on the sequels, The Empire Strikes Back and Return of the Jedi, and on 1981's Raiders of the Lost Ark, for which he won his second Academy Award and a BAFTA Award. He was subsequently art director on the 1978 film Superman and its 1980 sequel Superman II, and production designer on Return to Oz and Young Sherlock Holmes (both 1985) and Empire of the Sun (1987). He also worked on Alien 3 (1992) and Mission Impossible (1996).

Reynolds directed two episodes of the 1980s TV series Amazing Stories, "The Pumpkin Competition" and "Gather Ye Acorns". He was special effects director for The Exorcist III (1990) and second unit director for Alive (1993).

== Personal life and death ==
Reynolds and his wife, Ann, have three daughters and lived in Cheltenham. He often concealed his work, saying that he worked in a biscuit factory. Reynolds died on 2 April 2023 at the age of 89.

== Awards ==
=== Won ===
- 1978 Academy Award for Best Production Design – Star Wars Episode IV: A New Hope (shared with John Barry, Leslie Dilley, and Roger Christian)
- 1982 BAFTA Award for Best Production Design – Raiders of the Lost Ark (shared with Leslie Dilley and Michael D. Ford)
- 1982 Academy Award for Best Production Design – Raiders of the Lost Ark (shared with Leslie Dilley and Michael D. Ford)

=== Nominated ===
- 1977 Academy Award for Best Production Design – The Incredible Sarah (shared with Elliot Scott)
- 1981 Academy Award for Best Production Design – The Empire Strikes Back (shared with Leslie Dilley, Harry Lange, Alan Tomkins and Michael D. Ford)
- 1981 BAFTA Award for Best Production Design – The Empire Strikes Back
- 1984 Academy Award for Best Production Design – Return of the Jedi (shared with Fred Hole, James L. Schoppe, Michael D. Ford)
- 1984 BAFTA Award for Best Production Design – Return of the Jedi
- 1988 Academy Award for Best Production Design – Empire of the Sun (shared with Harry Cordwell)
- 1988 BAFTA Award for Best Production Design – Empire of the Sun (shared with Harry Cordwell)

== Selected filmography ==
=== As art director ===
- Superman II: The Richard Donner Cut (2006)
- Superman II (1980)
- Superman (1978)
- Star Wars Episode IV: A New Hope (1977)
- The Incredible Sarah (1976)
- Lucky Lady (1975)
- The Old Curiosity Shop (1975)
- The Little Prince (1974)

=== As production designer ===
- Bicentennial Man (1999)
- Sphere (1998)
- Mission: Impossible (1996)
- Clean Slate (1994)
- Alive (1993)
- Alien 3 (1992)
- Avalon (1990)
- Mountains of the Moon (1990)
- Empire of the Sun (1987)
- Young Sherlock Holmes (1985)
- Return to Oz (1985)
- Return of the Jedi (1983)
- Raiders of the Lost Ark (1981)
- The Empire Strikes Back (1980)
