= Leslie Dilley =

Welsh production designer (1941–2025)

- Born: 11 January 1941; Rhondda, Wales
- Died: 20 May 2025 (aged 84)
- Other names: Ivor Leslie Dilley; Les Dilley
- Occupations: Production designer, art director
- Years active: 1973–2025

Leslie Dilley (11 January 1941 – 20 May 2025) was a Welsh art director and production designer. During his film career from the 1970s to 2000s, he won the Academy Award for Best Art Direction twice for Star Wars Episode IV - A New Hope (1977) and Raiders of the Lost Ark (1981), sharing this both times with Norman Reynolds. Dilley received additional Best Art Direction nominations for Alien (1979), The Empire Strikes Back (1980), and The Abyss (1989). Apart from art direction, Dilley was a production designer for The Exorcist III (1990), Casper (1995), and Deep Impact (1998).

== Early life and education ==
Dilley was born in Rhondda Valley, South Wales on 11 January 1941. Growing up, Dilley and his family moved to London and lived in Wembley Park. For his post-secondary education, Dilley studied architecture at Willesden Technical College. While working as an apprentice plasterer during college, Dilley was encouraged by a classmate to apply for a job at Pinewood Studios. After Pinewood told him there were no open positions available, Dilley completed a five year plastering apprenticeship at the Associated British Picture Corporation.

== Career ==
At the ABPC, Dilley began his career as a drafter throughout the 1960s. While working as an Assistant Art Director during the early 1970s, Dilley became an art director for The Three Musketeers (1973). His art director tenure continued throughout the 1970s and 1980s with films such as Superman (1978), An American Werewolf in London (1981) and Never Say Never Again (1983). Outside of these movies, Dilley won the Academy Award for Best Art Direction for Star Wars (1977) and Raiders of the Lost Ark (1981). He additionally received Academy Award nominations for his art directorship on Alien (1979), The Empire Strikes Back (1980), and The Abyss (1989).

During the 1990s to 2000s, Dilley primarily worked as a production designer. Some of his production works during these decades include The Exorcist III (1990), Casper (1995), Inspector Gadget (1999), Son of the Mask (2005) and Little Man (2006). Dilley also made cameo appearances in his production designed films, including Deep Impact (1998) and Pay It Forward (2000).

== Death ==
Dilley died from complications of Alzheimer's disease on 20 May 2025, at the age of 84.

== Selected filmography ==
Dilley won two Academy Awards for Best Art Direction and was nominated for three more:

Won

- Star Wars (1977)
- Raiders of the Lost Ark (1981)

Nominated

- Alien (1979)
- The Empire Strikes Back (1980)
- The Abyss (1989)
