= Rob Coleman =

Canadian animation director

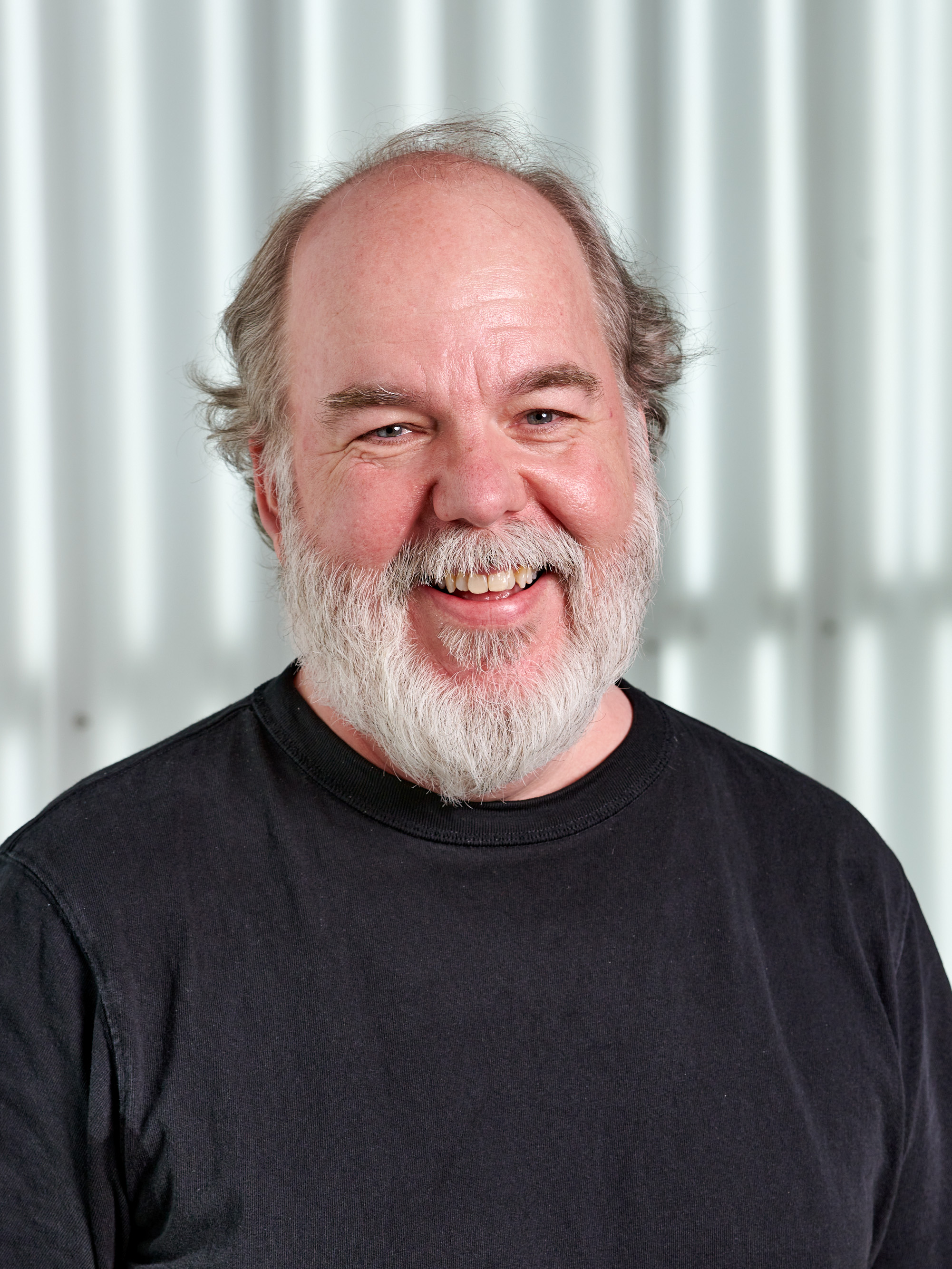
- Rob Coleman in 2021
- Born: Toronto, Ontario, Canada
- Education: Bachelor of Fine Arts (Animation), Concordia University (Montréal, Canada), 1987
- Occupation: Creative Director / Animation Director
- Years active: 1987-present
- Employer(s): Industrial Light & Magic
- Known for: Visual Effects & Character Animation

Rob Coleman is a Canadian animation director; he is currently the creative director at Industrial Light & Magic's Sydney branch. Previously, he was the Head of Animation at the award-winning Australian visual effects and animation studio, Animal Logic , from 2012-2021.

Coleman is a two-time Oscar nominee for his animation work on Star Wars: Episode I – The Phantom Menace and Star Wars: Episode II – Attack of the Clones and has been nominated for two BAFTA Awards for his work on Men in Black and The Phantom Menace.

Prior to moving to Australia, Coleman spent 14 years at Industrial Light & Magic and Lucasfilm Animation, (1993-2007) working most notably with George Lucas on the Star Wars prequels as animation director and on The Clone Wars animated series. He was chosen as one of the most creative people in the entertainment industry when he was added to Entertainment Weekly's "It List" in 2002 as their "It CG-Creature Crafter" for his work on digital Yoda.

== Oscar history ==
Both nominations were in the category of Best Visual Effects

- 72nd Academy Awards-Nominated for Star Wars: Episode I – The Phantom Menace. Nomination shared with John Knoll, Dennis Muren and Scott Squires. Lost to The Matrix.
- 75th Academy Awards-Nominated for Star Wars: Episode II – Attack of the Clones. Nomination shared with Pablo Helman, John Knoll and Ben Snow. Lost to The Lord of the Rings: The Two Towers.

== Selected filmography ==
- Captain Power and the Soldiers of the Future (1987-1988, TV series, animation/live action coordinator - 22 episodes)
- Maverick (1994, computer graphics animator: ILM)
- The Mask (1994, computer graphics animator)
- Star Trek Generations (1994, computer effects artist: ILM)
- In the Mouth of Madness (1994, computer graphics animator)
- The Indian in the Cupboard (1995, computer graphics artist)
- Dragonheart (1996, supervising character animator)
- Men in Black (1997, animation supervisor)
- Star Wars: Episode I – The Phantom Menace (1999, animation director)
- Star Wars: Episode II – Attack of the Clones (2002, animation director)
- Signs (2002, animation supervisor)
- Star Wars: Episode III – Revenge of the Sith (2005, animation director: ILM)
- Star Wars: The Clone Wars (2008, film, animation consultant)
- Star Wars: The Clone Wars (2008, TV series, animation consultant, 8 episodes)
- Happy Feet Two (2011, animation director)
- The Lego Movie (2014, head of animation: Animal Logic)
- The Lego Batman Movie (2017, animation supervisor)
- The Lego Ninjago Movie (2017, head of animation: Animal Logic)
- Peter Rabbit (2018, animation director)
- The Lego Movie 2: The Second Part (2019, head of animation: Animal Logic)
- Peter Rabbit 2: The Runaway (2021, head of animation: Animal Logic)
- DC League of Super-Pets (2022, head of animation: Animal Logic)
