= Mike Mulholland =

Mike Mulholland is a special effects artist. He was nominated for the Academy Award for Best Visual Effects for Star Wars: The Last Jedi.
