= James L. Schoppe =

Art director

- Occupations: Production designer Art director
- Years active: 1972–2006

James L. Schoppe is an American production designer and art director. He was nominated for an Academy Award in the category Best Art Direction for the film Return of the Jedi.

== Selected filmography ==
- Return of the Jedi (1983)
