= Music of Star Wars =

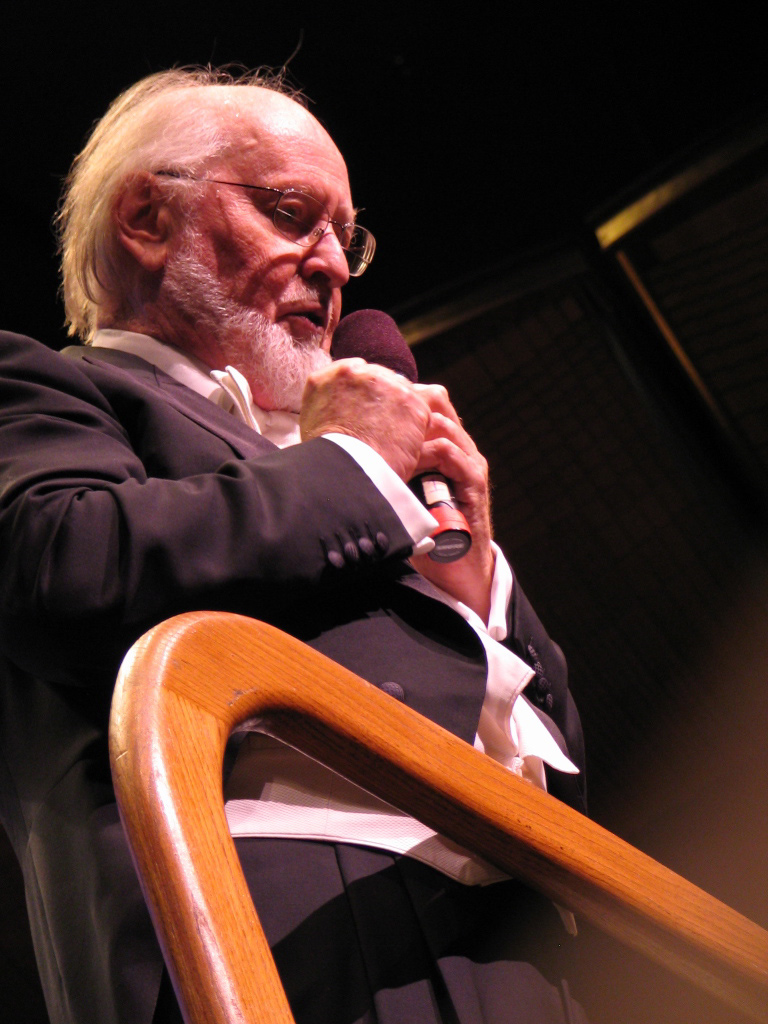
John Williams, composer of the music of all nine Skywalker Saga films

The music of the Star Wars franchise is composed and produced in conjunction with the development of the feature films, television series, and other merchandise within the epic space opera multimedia franchise created by George Lucas. The music for the primary feature films (which serves as the basis for the rest of the related media) was written by John Williams. Williams' work on the series included the scores of nine feature films, a suite and several cues of thematic material for Solo: A Star Wars Story and the theme music for the Star Wars: Galaxy's Edge theme parks at Disneyland and Walt Disney World. These count among the most widely known and popular contributions to modern film music, and utilize a symphony orchestra and features an assortment of about fifty recurring musical themes to represent characters and other plot elements: one of the largest caches of themes in the history of film music.

Released between 1977 and 2019, the music for the primary feature films was, in the case of the first two trilogies, performed by the London Symphony Orchestra and, in select passages, by the London Voices chorus. The sequel trilogy was largely conducted by Williams and William Ross, and performed by the Hollywood Freelance Studio Symphony and (in a few passages) by the Los Angeles Master Chorale.

Additional composers have since contributed music to other movies and media within the Star Wars universe. The music for several animated and live-action television series spin-offs has been written by Kevin Kiner, Ludwig Göransson, Natalie Holt, Nicholas Britell, and Ryan Shore. Music for the spin-off films, other television programs, and video games, as well as the trailers of the various installments, were created by various other composers, with this material occasionally revisiting some of Williams' principal themes (and, with one spin-off film, with Williams actually writing a new theme for the composer to use).

The scores are primarily performed by a symphony orchestra of varying size joined, in several sections, by a choir of varying size. (Note: Williams generally uses the choir for texture, as humming or wordless voices. Several sections rely on repeated syllables in Sanskrit, as is the case of Duel of the Fates or Snoke's theme. While the syllables are drawn from (loosely) translated texts such as Cad Goddeu or the writing of Kipling, Williams typically arranges them by ear and without heed to their meaning, so the choral text remains repetitive and meaningless. In other instances, the choir repeats a short albeit coherent sentence, such as with the Funeral theme or Anakin's Dark Deeds.) They each make extensive use of the leitmotif, or a series of musical themes that represents the various characters, objects and events in the films. Throughout all of the franchise, which consists of a total of over 18 hours of music, (Note: Including all the alternate takes of the recording, Williams has recorded about 21 hours of music for the series, although much of it remains unreleased.) Williams has written approximately sixty or seventy themes, in one of the largest, richest collection of themes in the history of film music.

== Overview ==
=== Films ===
Year	Title	Composer	Conductor	Orchestrator/Arranger	Orchestra	Choir
Saga films
1977	Star Wars	John Williams	John Williams	Herbert W. Spencer	London Symphony Orchestra	
1980	The Empire Strikes Back	John Williams	John Williams	Herbert W. Spencer	London Symphony Orchestra	London Voices (women)
1983	Return of the Jedi	John Williams	John Williams	Herbert W. Spencer	London Symphony Orchestra	London Voices (men (Note: Women were used for the special edition rescoring.))
1999	The Phantom Menace	John Williams	John Williams	Conrad Pope; John Neufeld	London Symphony Orchestra	London Voices (SATB) New London Children's Choir
2002	Attack of the Clones	John Williams	John Williams	Conrad Pope; Eddie Karam	London Symphony Orchestra	London Voices (SATB) Boy choir (synth)
2005	Revenge of the Sith	John Williams	John Williams	Conrad Pope; Eddie Karam	London Symphony Orchestra	London Voices (SATB) Boy choir (synth)
2015	The Force Awakens	John Williams	John Williams; William Ross; Gustavo Dudamel	John Williams; William Ross	Hollywood Freelance Studio Symphony (Note: This orchestra consists of a group of individually contracted freelanced musicians, rather than being an organised orchestra that plays regularly as a group.)	Hollywood Film Chorale (bass)
2017	The Last Jedi	John Williams	John Williams; William Ross	John Williams; William Ross	Hollywood Freelance Studio Symphony	Los Angeles Master Chorale (SATB, bass)
2019	The Rise of Skywalker	John Williams	John Williams	John Williams; William Ross	Hollywood Freelance Studio Symphony	Los Angeles Master Chorale (SATB, bass)
Anthology films
1978	The Star Wars Holiday Special	Ian Fraser; John Williams (Original Themes)	Ian Fraser			
1984	Caravan of Courage: An Ewok Adventure	Peter Bernstein; John Williams (Original Themes)	Peter Bernstein			
1985	Ewoks: The Battle for Endor	Peter Bernstein; John Williams (Original Themes)	Peter Bernstein			
2016	Rogue One	Michael Giacchino; John Williams (Original Themes)	Tim Simonec	William Ross; Tim Simonec; Brad Dechter; Jeff Kryka; Chris Tilton; Herbert W. Spencer	Hollywood Freelance Studio Symphony	Los Angeles Master Chorale
2018	Solo	John Powell; John Williams (Han Solo Theme, Original Themes)	Gavin Greenaway	(additional music and arrangements) Batu Sener; Anthony Willis; Paul Mounsey	The London Session Orchestra; Recording Arts Orchestra of Los Angeles (Han Solo Theme)	
2026	The Mandalorian and Grogu	Ludwig Göransson				
Animated films
2008	The Clone Wars	Kevin Kiner; John Williams (Original Themes)	Kevin Kiner; Nic Raine	Kevin Kiner; Nic Raine; Takeshi Furukawa	City of Prague Philharmonic Orchestra	

=== Television ===
==== Animation series ====
Kevin Kiner composed the score to the film Star Wars: The Clone Wars (2008), the predecessor to the animated TV series of the same name. Both properties loosely use some of the original themes and music by John Williams. Kiner's own material for the film includes a theme for Anakin Skywalker's Padawan learner, Ahsoka Tano, as well as a theme for Jabba the Hutt's uncle Ziro. Kiner went on to score the TV series' entire seven seasons, which concluded in 2020. A soundtrack album for the first six seasons was released in 2014 by Walt Disney Records and three soundtrack albums for the final season were released in 2020.

Kiner continued his work with the franchise for the animated series Star Wars Rebels (2014–2018), which also incorporates Williams' themes. He had later made the score for Star Wars: The Bad Batch (2021–2024) and Star Wars: Tales (2022–2025), spin-offs of The Clone Wars.

James L. Venable and Paul Dinletir composed the music of Star Wars: Clone Wars (2003–2005) 2D animated series, Ryan Shore serves as the composer for Star Wars: Forces of Destiny (2017–2018) and Star Wars Galaxy of Adventures (2018–2020), and Michael Tavera composes the score to Star Wars Resistance (2018–2020).

Matthew Margeson produced the soundtrack for Star Wars: Young Jedi Adventures in 2023.

Year	Title	Composer	Additional composers
2003–2005	Star Wars: Clone Wars: Seasons 1-3	James L. Venable; Paul Dinletir	
2008–2014	Star Wars: The Clone Wars: Seasons 1-6	Kevin Kiner	Takeshi Furukawa; David G. Russell; Matthew St. Laurent; Reuven Herman; Russ Howard III
2014–2015	Star Wars Rebels: Season 1	Kevin Kiner	Matthew St. Laurent; Jared Forman; David G. Russell; Sean Kiner; Deana Kiner; Julian Cisneros; Reuven Herman
2015–2016	Star Wars Rebels: Season 2	Kevin Kiner	Matthew St. Laurent; Jared Forman; David G. Russell; Sean Kiner; Deana Kiner; Julian Cisneros; Reuven Herman
2016–2017	Star Wars Rebels: Season 3	Kevin Kiner	Matthew St. Laurent; Jared Forman; David G. Russell; Sean Kiner; Deana Kiner; Julian Cisneros; Reuven Herman
2017–2018	Star Wars Rebels: Season 4	Kevin Kiner	Matthew St. Laurent; Jared Forman; David G. Russell; Sean Kiner; Deana Kiner; Julian Cisneros; Reuven Herman
2017–2018	Star Wars: Forces of Destiny: Seasons 1-2	Ryan Shore	
2018–2020	Star Wars: Galaxy of Adventures: Seasons 1-2	Ryan Shore	
2018–2020	Star Wars Resistance: Seasons 1-2	Michael Tavera	
2020	Star Wars: The Clone Wars: Season 7 (Episodes 1-4)	Kevin Kiner	Sean Kiner; Deana Kiner
2020	Star Wars: The Clone Wars: Season 7 (Episodes 5-8)	Kevin Kiner	Sean Kiner; Deana Kiner
2020	Star Wars: The Clone Wars: Season 7 (Episodes 9-12)	Kevin Kiner	Sean Kiner; Deana Kiner
2021	Star Wars: The Bad Batch: Season 1 (Episodes 1-8)	Kevin Kiner	Sean Kiner; Deana Kiner
2021	Star Wars: The Bad Batch: Season 1 (Episodes 9-16)	Kevin Kiner	Sean Kiner; Deana Kiner
2022	Star Wars: Tales of the Jedi	Kevin Kiner	Sean Kiner; Deana Kiner
2023	Star Wars: The Bad Batch: Season 2 (Episodes 1-8)	Kevin Kiner	Sean Kiner; Deana Kiner
2023	Star Wars: The Bad Batch: Season 2 (Episodes 9-16)	Kevin Kiner	Sean Kiner; Deana Kiner
2023–2024	Star Wars: Young Jedi Adventures: Season 1	Matthew Margeson	
2024	Star Wars: The Bad Batch: Season 3 (Episodes 1-8)	Kevin Kiner	Sean Kiner; Deana Kiner
2024	Star Wars: The Bad Batch: Season 3 (Episodes 9-15)	Kevin Kiner	Sean Kiner; Deana Kiner
2024	Star Wars: Tales of the Empire	Kevin Kiner	Sean Kiner; Deana Kiner
2024–2025	Star Wars: Young Jedi Adventures: Season 2	Matthew Margeson	
2025	Star Wars: Tales of the Underworld	Kevin Kiner	Sean Kiner; Deana Kiner
2026	Star Wars: Maul – Shadow Lord	Kevin Kiner	Sean Kiner; Deana Kiner

===== Star Wars: Visions =====
Various composers worked on the animated anthology series Star Wars: Visions.

Year	Title	Composer(s)
2021	Star Wars: Visions: Season 1 (The Duel)	Keiji Inai
2021	Star Wars: Visions: Season 1 (Tatooine Rhapsody)	Yoshiaki Dewa
2021	Star Wars: Visions: Season 1 (The Twins)	Michiru Oshima
2021	Star Wars: Visions: Season 1 (The Village Bride)	Kevin Penkin
2021	Star Wars: Visions: Season 1 (The Ninth Jedi)	Nobuko Toda; Kazuma Jinnouchi
2021	Star Wars: Visions: Season 1 (T0-B1)	A-Bee; Keiichiro Shibuya
2021	Star Wars: Visions: Season 1 (The Elder)	Michiru Oshima
2021	Star Wars: Visions: Season 1 (Lop & Ocho)	Yoshiaki Dewa
2021	Star Wars: Visions: Season 1 (Akakiri)	U-Zhaan
2023	Star Wars: Visions: Season 2 (Sith)	Dan Levy
2023	Star Wars: Visions: Season 2 (Screecher's Reach)	Leo Pearson
2023	Star Wars: Visions: Season 2 (In the Stars)	Andrés Walker; Patricio Portius
2023	Star Wars: Visions: Season 2 (I Am Your Mother)	Jean-Marc Petsas
2023	Star Wars: Visions: Season 2 (Journey to the Dark Head)	Jang Young Gyu; Lee Byung-Hoon
2023	Star Wars: Visions: Season 2 (The Spy Dancer)	Olivier Deriviere
2023	Star Wars: Visions: Season 2 (The Bandits of Golak)	Sneha Khanwalkar
2023	Star Wars: Visions: Season 2 (The Pit)	Daniel Lopatin
2023	Star Wars: Visions: Season 2 (Aau's Song)	Markus Wormstorm
2025		
2026	Star Wars: Visions Presents - The Ninth Jedi	

===== LEGO Star Wars =====
A list of LEGO Star Wars animated TV series & specials and their score composers:

Year	Title	Composer
2002	LEGO Star Wars: The Han Solo Affair	Jason Graves; John Williams (themes)
2005	LEGO Star Wars: Revenge of the Brick	Kostia Efimov; John Williams (themes)
2009	LEGO Star Wars: The Quest for R2-D2	Anthony Lledo; John Williams (themes)
2010	LEGO Star Wars: Bombad Bounty	Anthony Lledo; John Williams (themes)
2011	LEGO Star Wars: The Padawan Menace	John Williams
2012	LEGO Star Wars: The Empire Strikes Out	John Williams
2013–2014	LEGO Star Wars: The Yoda Chronicles	John Williams
2015	LEGO Star Wars: Droid Tales	John Williams
2016–2017	LEGO Star Wars: The Freemaker Adventures	Michael Kramer; John Williams (themes)
2018	LEGO Star Wars: All-Stars	Michael Kramer; John Williams (themes)
2020	The LEGO Star Wars Holiday Special	Michael Kramer; John Williams (themes)
2021	LEGO Star Wars: Terrifying Tales	Michael Kramer; John Williams (themes)
2022	LEGO Star Wars: Summer Vacation	Michael Kramer; John Williams (themes)
2024–2025	LEGO Star Wars: Rebuild the Galaxy	Michael Kramer; Roberto Prado; John Williams (themes)

===== Zen: Grogu and Dust Bunnies =====
For the hand drawn anime short by Studio Ghibli Grogu and Dust Bunnies, Ludwig Göransson composes the score.

Year	Title	Composer
2022	Zen - Grogu and Dust Bunnies	Ludwig Göransson

==== Live-action series ====
===== The Mandalorian =====
For the Disney+ series The Mandalorian, Oscar-winner Ludwig Göransson composes the score. For the third season of the series, Joseph Shirley was revealed to be composing the score for the season, replacing Ludwig Göransson. Shirley previously provided additional music for the first two seasons and used Göransson's themes to compose the score for The Book of Boba Fett.

Year	Title	Composer(s)
2019	The Mandalorian: Season 1 (Chapter 1)	Ludwig Göransson
2019	The Mandalorian: Season 1 (Chapter 2)	Ludwig Göransson
2019	The Mandalorian: Season 1 (Chapter 3)	Ludwig Göransson
2019	The Mandalorian: Season 1 (Chapter 4)	Ludwig Göransson
2019	The Mandalorian: Season 1 (Chapter 5)	Ludwig Göransson
2019	The Mandalorian: Season 1 (Chapter 6)	Ludwig Göransson
2019	The Mandalorian: Season 1 (Chapter 7)	Ludwig Göransson
2019	The Mandalorian: Season 1 (Chapter 8)	Ludwig Göransson
2020	The Mandalorian: Season 2 (Chapters 9-12)	Ludwig Göransson
2020	The Mandalorian: Season 2 (Chapters 13-16)	Ludwig Göransson
2023	The Mandalorian: Season 3 (Chapters 17-20)	Joseph Shirley; Ludwig Göransson (themes)
2023	The Mandalorian: Season 3 (Chapters 21-24)	Joseph Shirley; Ludwig Göransson (themes)

===== The Book of Boba Fett =====
For the Disney+ series The Book of Boba Fett, Ludwig Göransson composes the main theme, while Joseph Shirley composes the score.

Year	Title	Composer(s)
2021–2022	The Book of Boba Fett: Season 1 (Chapters 1-4)	Ludwig Göransson; Joseph Shirley
2021–2022	The Book of Boba Fett: Season 1 (Chapters 5-7)	Ludwig Göransson; Joseph Shirley

===== Obi-Wan Kenobi =====
For the Disney+ series Obi-Wan Kenobi, John Williams returned to write the main theme. Natalie Holt composed the rest of the score, making her the first woman to score a live-action Star Wars project.

Year	Title	Composer(s)
2022	Obi-Wan Kenobi: Season 1	John Williams; Natalie Holt; William Ross

===== Andor =====
For the Disney+ series Andor, Nicholas Britell composes the score. For the second season Brandon Roberts composes the main score along with Britell composing additional scores.

Year	Title	Composer(s)
2022	Andor: Season 1 (Episodes 1-4)	Nicholas Britell
2022	Andor: Season 1 (Episodes 5-8)	Nicholas Britell
2022	Andor: Season 1 (Episodes 9-12)	Nicholas Britell
2025	Andor: Season 2 (Episodes 1-3)	Brandon Roberts; Nicholas Britell (themes)
2025	Andor: Season 2 (Episodes 4-6)	Brandon Roberts; Nicholas Britell (themes)
2025	Andor: Season 2 (Episodes 7-9)	Brandon Roberts; Nicholas Britell (themes)
2025	Andor: Season 2 (Episodes 10-12)	Brandon Roberts; Nicholas Britell (themes)

===== Ahsoka =====
In April 2023, during Star Wars Celebration London, it was revealed that Kevin Kiner would compose the score for Ahsoka, after previously composing the music for the animated series The Clone Wars, Rebels, The Bad Batch, and Tales.

Year	Title	Composer(s)
2023	Ahsoka: Season 1 (Episodes 1-4)	Kevin Kiner
2023	Ahsoka: Season 1 (Episodes 5-8)	Kevin Kiner
2027		

===== The Acolyte =====
In February 2024 it was revealed that Michael Abels had been tapped to compose the score for Star Wars: The Acolyte.

Year	Title	Composer(s)
2024	The Acolyte: Season 1 (Episodes 1-4)	Michael Abels
2024	The Acolyte: Season 1 (Episodes 5-8)	Michael Abels

===== Skeleton Crew =====
In November 2024, Mick Giacchino was revealed to have composed the score for the series. His father, Michael Giacchino, previously composed the score for the Star Wars film Rogue One (2016).

Year	Title	Composer(s)
2024–2025	Star Wars: Skeleton Crew: Season 1	Mick Giacchino

==== Jedi Temple Challenge ====
For the game show Jedi Temple Challenge, Gordy Haab composes the score.

Year	Title	Composer(s)
2020	Star Wars: Jedi Temple Challenge: Season 1	Gordy Haab

=== Documentaries ===
Year	Title	Composer	Additional composers
2004	Empire of Dreams: The Story of the Star Wars Trilogy	John Williams	
2020	Disney Gallery: The Mandalorian: Season 1	Michael Kramer	
2020–2021	Disney Gallery: The Mandalorian: Season 2	Michael Kramer	
2021	Disney Gallery: The Book of Boba Fett	Michael Kramer	
2022	Light & Magic: Season 1	James Newton Howard	Michael Dean Parsons; Xander Rodzinski; Tobin Pugash
2022	Obi-Wan Kenobi: A Jedi's Return	Michael Dean Parsons; Scott Michael Smith	
2023	Disney Gallery: The Mandalorian: Season 3	Michael Kramer	
2023	A Disturbance in the Force	Karl Preusser	
2025	Light & Magic: Season 2	Michael Dean Parsons; Xander Rodzinski	

=== Video games ===
Year	Title	Composer
1995	Star Wars: Dark Forces	Clint Bajakian
1996	Star Wars: Shadows of the Empire	Joel McNeely
1998	Star Wars: Rogue Squadron	Chris Huelsbeck
2001	Star Wars Rogue Squadron II: Rogue Leader	Chris Huelsbeck
2002	Star Wars: Bounty Hunter	Jeremy Soule
2003	Star Wars: Knights of the Old Republic	Jeremy Soule
2003	Star Wars Rogue Squadron III: Rebel Strike	Chris Huelsbeck
2003	Star Wars Knights of the Old Republic II: The Sith Lords	Mark Griskey
2005	Star Wars: Republic Commando	Jesse Harlin
2006	Star Wars: Empire at War	Frank Klepacki
2008	Star Wars: The Force Unleashed	Mark Griskey; Jesse Harlin
2010	Star Wars: The Force Unleashed II	Mark Griskey
2011	Star Wars: The Old Republic	Mark Griskey; Wilbert Roget II; Gordy Haab; Lennie Moore; Jesse Harlin; Peter McConnel; Jared Emerson-Johnson; Steve Kirk; Henri Wilkinson; Samuel Joseph Smythe; Madison Denbrock; Marco Valerio Antonini; Yitong ET Chen; Vincent Oppido
2015	Star Wars: Battlefront	Gordy Haab
2017	Star Wars: Battlefront II	Gordy Haab
2019	Star Wars Jedi: Fallen Order	Stephen Barton; Gordy Haab
2020	Star Wars: Squadrons	Gordy Haab
2020	Star Wars: Tales from the Galaxy's Edge	Bear McCreary; Joseph Trapanese; Danny Piccione
2023	Star Wars Jedi: Survivor	Stephen Barton; Gordy Haab
2024	Star Wars: Hunters	Gordy Haab
2024	Star Wars: Outlaws	Wilbert Roget II; Kazuma Jinnouchi; Jon Everist; Cody Matthew Johnson

=== Multimedia / Theme Parks ===
Year	Title	Composer
1996	Star Wars: Shadows of the Empire	Joel McNeely
2019	Star Wars: Galaxy's Edge	John Williams; Harlan Hodges; Randy Kerber

=== Other albums ===
Year	Title	Composer
1980	Star Wars: Christmas in the Stars	Meco
2016	Star Wars: Headspace	Various Artists
2019	Star Wars: Galaxy's Edge: Oga's Cantina: R3X's Playlist 1	Various Artists
2023	Star Wars: Galaxy's Edge: Oga's Cantina: R3X's Playlist 2	Various Artists
2023	Star Wars: Galactic Starcruiser	Gaya

== Style ==
=== Inspiration ===
The scores utilize an eclectic variety of musical styles, many culled from the Late Romantic idiom of Richard Strauss and his contemporaries that itself was incorporated into the Golden Age Hollywood scores of Erich Korngold and Max Steiner. The reasons for this are known to involve George Lucas's desire to allude to the underlying fantasy element of the narrative rather than the science-fiction setting, as well as to ground the otherwise strange and fantastic setting in recognizable, audience-accessible music. Indeed, Lucas maintains that much of the films' success relies not on advanced visual effects, but on the simple, direct emotional appeal of its plot, characters and, importantly, music.

Lucas originally wanted to use tracked orchestral and film music in a similar manner to 2001: A Space Odyssey, itself a major inspiration for Star Wars. Williams, who was hired to consult and possibly work on the source music, was advised to form a soundtrack with recurring musical themes to augment the story, while Lucas's choice of music could be used as a temporary track for Williams to base his musical choices on. This resulted in several nods or homages to the music of Gustav Holst, William Walton, Sergei Prokofiev and Igor Stravinsky in the score to Star Wars. (Note: That particular score was first intended to be tracked with existing music from the classical repertoire or from older film scores, as was the case of 2001: A Space Odyssey, which inspired George Lucas to write the film. After Williams convinced Lucas to have an original score (which would excel as a tracked score in that it will have set themes for characters, Williams argued), those musical pieces were used as a temp track and Williams followed them closely, turning portions of the score into a homage to earlier film score and to romantic music in general.) Williams relied less and less on references to existing music in the latter eight scores, incorporating more strains of modernist orchestral writing with each progressive score, although occasional nods continue to permeate the music. The score to Revenge of the Sith has clear resemblances to the successful scores of other contemporary composers of the time, namely Howard Shore's Lord of the Rings, Hans Zimmer's Gladiator and Tan Dun's Crouching Tiger, Hidden Dragon, with which the movie was most likely scored contemporarily. (Note: These inspirations are evident in some of the orchestration choices, including the wide use of an SATB choir and boy choir and even a soloist (including a woman singing mournfully in "Padme's Ruminations", similar to Lisa Gerard's vocal work in Gladiator). The orchestra was augmented with a second set of timpani as was the case with Shore's Lord of the Rings scores, and with taiko drums, which have been used extensively by Shore and Zimmer. In particular, Anakin's Dark Deeds with the humming boy choir opening leading into a Gothic piece for an adult choir is evocative of "The Treason of Isengard". Several tracks, including the music to the film's opening, evoke the Orcs' rhythmic music.) However, his later scores were otherwise mostly tracked with music of his own composition, mainly from previous Star Wars films. Williams also started to develop his style throughout the various films, incorporating other instruments, unconventional orchestral set-ups (as well as various choral ensembles) and even electronic or electronically attenuated music as the films progressed. Williams often composed the music in a heroic but tongue-in-cheek style, and has described the scored film as a "musical".

=== Structure ===
Star Wars was one of the film scores that heralded the revival of grand symphonic scores in the late 1970s. One technique that particularly influenced these scores is Williams' use of the leitmotif, which was most famously associated with Richard Wagner's Der Ring Des Nibelungen and, in early film scores, with Steiner. A leitmotif (or leading motive) is a recurring, evolving musical theme for narrative elements such as characters, locations, ideas, sentiments, objects or other specific part of the film. It is commonly used in modern film scoring as a device for mentally anchoring certain parts of a film to the soundtrack. (Note: Using a leitmotif merely as a "stand-in" for a character would be a devolved form of using leitmotifs, compared to the operatic practice. A theme can be used symbolically, such as hinting at Darth Vader's theme when the decision to train Anakin is made in Episode I.) Of chief importance for a leitmotif is that it must be strong enough for a listener to latch onto while being flexible enough to undergo variation and development along the progression of the story. The more varied and nuanced the use of leitmotif is, the more memorable it typically becomes. A good example of this is the way in which Williams subtly conceals the intervals of "The Imperial March" within "Anakin's Theme" in The Phantom Menace, implying his dark future to come.

Also important is the density in which leitmotifs are used: the more leitmotifs are used in a piece of a given length, the more thematically rich it is considered to be. Film music, however, typically needs to strike a balance between the number of leitmotifs used, so as to not become too dense for the audience (being preoccupied with the visuals) to follow. Williams' music of Star Wars is unique in that it is relatively dense for film scoring, with approximately 17 themes used in each two-hour film, of which about 90% is scored. (Note: Williams full score often slightly overtakes the length of the film due to the recording of concert suites and several alternate takes. However, the amount of music written for the film proper varies from 80 percent, to scoring effectively the entire film. The finished film is always subjected to tracking, looping and muting (especially Attack of the Clones), so about 85% of each finished film is scored.)

=== Performance ===
In 1990, Williams re-recorded some of his suites from the first trilogy with the Skywalker Symphony Orchestra as an album. Several of his later themes were released as singles and music videos, and were later released a collection of suites from the six films as a compilation that played to a series of clips from the films, with sparse dialogue and sound effects. These became the basis for a series of hour-long concerts which featured Star Wars music to images from the films, Star Wars: In Concert, which took place in 2009 and 2010. First performed in London, it went on to tour across the United States and Canada, last playing in London, Ontario, Canada on July 25, 2010.

The scores of the first trilogy (in the form of its Blu-Ray release) and The Force Awakens are performed as Live to Projection concerts, but with greatly reduced forces. The performances follow the music of the finished film, with some of the music looped, tracked or omitted entirely, and do not feature any of the diegetic pieces and often omit the choral parts.

== Orchestration ==
John Williams sketched the score for his various orchestrations and wrote the music for a full symphony orchestra (ranging from 79 to 113 players overall (Note: Episode III required 109 players (not including the conductor) due to the fuller string and percussion sections.)

The Empire Strikes Back required 104 players, not including the conductor or synthesizer (rhttp://www.jw-collection.de/scores/tesblp.htmecalls) due to the inclusion of a fourth flute, and sections that required a third harp, five oboes overall, an added piccolo and eight percussionists overall.

If the Empire Strikes Back is to augmented with the string section size of Revenge of the Sith or the Skywalker Symphony Recording, it would require about 112 players and a small women choir.

A Star Wars in Concert production that would follow the orchestration of the recording, would have to feature some of the expansions of the various episodes, requiring about 110 players, as well as the mixed choir and possibly the bass choir.) and, in several passages, chorus (ranging from 12 to 120 singers overall) and a few non-orchestral instruments. The orchestration is not consistent across every film, (Note: Star Wars and the sequel trilogy film use an 84-piece arrangement, with the latter also incorporating a 24-piece men choir. Empire Strikes Back uses 106 pieces and about ten women vocalists, Return of the Jedi uses a 100-piece orchestra, about ten male vocalists, and a few female singers for the Special Edition; The Phantom Menace uses a 100-piece orchestra, 88-piece SATB choir and 30 boy vocalists; Attack of the Clones and Revenge of the Sith use a 112-piece orchestra, 89-piece SATB choir and a synthesized boy choir.) but generally, the score makes use of a considerable brass section over a comparatively smaller string section, giving the series its heraldic, brassy sound.

Several of the scores require larger forces, including a large (over 100-piece) romantic-period orchestra, a mixed choir and even a boy choir, although none of the scores call for particularly immense forces compared to larger film or theater works. (Note: Star Wars Concerts were held with as few as 130 performers, and some Live to Projection Concerts can therefore be played by as few as sixty players. By comparison, each of Howard Shore's Middle Earth scores require a minimum of 230 musicians to stage (ranging to as many as 500), and several stage works such as Gurre Lieder or Mahler's Eighth Symphony can range from 300 to over a thousand musicians. Nevertheless, amateur performances (like the NJYS Playathon) of Williams score, among other film scores (including the aforementioned Howard Shore ones) have utilized orchestral forces of 450-piece or more.) Nevertheless, due to added high woodwinds and percussion parts, scores such as Empire Strikes Back and Attack of the Clones call for 106 and 110 players, respectively. The former called for a third harp and fourth bassoon, while the latter (and all prequel scores) utilized a fuller string section. Revenge of the Sith also utilized a second set of timpani. Comparatively, the original Star Wars trilogy and the sequel trilogy films call for much smaller forces of as little as 82 players, and small choral accompaniment in select cues. (Note: The Last Jedi used 101 instrumental players (including the diegetic band), probably a result of added percussion and high woodwind players, a 65-piece SATB choir, and a few additional pieces for the all-male choir.) The first spin-off film, Rogue One, followed the prequel trilogy's instrumentation, using a 110-piece orchestra and 90-piece mixed choir.

In live performances, the forces are usually greatly reduced: Official Star Wars Concerts were held with as little as 60-piece orchestras and 50-piece mixed choral ensembles or with the choir omitted altogether.

(Note: The Live to Projection presentations also feature various reductions, namely in the brass section, in line with Williams' reduced orchestration for his "Star Wars Suite", and generally omit the unusual orchestrations of Empire Strikes Back and synthesize or remove the choral parts The roster is between 50 and 90 pieces.) However, to recreate the nine scores as they were originally recorded, the following instrumentation would be needed:

- Woodwinds: 3 flutes (doubling on piccolos and an alto flute), 2 oboes (doubling on a cor anglais), 3 clarinets (doubling on a bass clarinet and an E-flat clarinet), 2 bassoons (doubling on a contrabassoon).
- Brass: 6 horns (doubling on Wagner Tubas (Note: Empire Strikes Back only.)), 4 trumpets, 3 trombones (doubling on a bass trombone), tuba.
- Keyboards: Piano, celesta, synthesizer. (Note: Star Wars featured one player on a piano and a second player on celesta. The second player also doubles on Electric Piano. For select sections of Empire Strikes Back, both played on pianos. The scores also used synthesizers for electronic sounds and to mimic the Celesta (a real Celesta was not used since Return of the Jedi) and the Harpsichord (for Return of the Jedi and Attack of the Clones). In the Skywalker Symphony recording, one player doubles on all keyboards. From Attack of the Clones going forward, the synth is performed by the electric keyboard player.)
- Timpani: 4–6 kettledrums.
- Percussion: at least three percussionists playing bass drums, tenor drums, snare drums (including guillotine drums, side drums, military drums), timbales, toms (floor tom and hanging toms), triangle, tambourine, cymbals (suspended, sizzle, crash and finger cymbals), tam-tam, xylophones, vibraphone, glockenspiel, tubular bells, and anvil on all episodes. Also required are temple blocks (I), claves (II, V, VI), ratchet (V–VIII), marimba (I, IV, VII–VIII), bongos (I, IV, VII–VIII), congas (I–III, VI–VII), log drums (I, IV, VI–VII), low wood block (IV), bell plates, clappers (IV), steel drum (IV, VIII), boobams (I, IV, VII), medium gong (VI–VII), kendhang, rattle, sistrum, shekere, guiro, bamboo sticks, cowbells, hyoshigi (VI), bell tree (III), one medium Thai gong (VI), three medium chu-daiko drums (II–III, one for VII–VIII), washboard, goblet drum, caxixi (VIII). (Note: Most of the episodes feature six percussionists, although sections of the prequels and Empire Strikes Back require as many as eight, including two Xylophone parts, etc. Star Wars, however, only requires only three and the sequel trilogy scores require only four.)
- Strings: 2 harps, 14 first violins, 12 second violins, 10 violas, 10 violoncellos, 6 double basses.
- Additional instruments: 1 piccolo, 1 flute, 1–2 recorders, 2 oboes, 1 clarinet, 3 saxophones, 1–2 bassoons, (Note: Star Wars uses the original arrangement, but its two sequels call for an additional of one of each woodwind. The prequel trilogy scores use three flutes, oboes and bassoons, as well as four clarinets, and the sequel trilogy scores omit the fourth clarinet part. Sections of Empire Strikes Back, Attack of the Clones, Revenge of the Sith and The Last Jedi call for expanded higher woodwind: four flutes and an added piccolo part and five oboes. The former score also calls for a fourth bassoon for Boba Fett's motif. Return of the Jedi and The Phantom Menace also feature recorders. Star Wars and The Last Jedi use three saxophones, as well.) 2 horns, trumpet, trombone, tuba, (Note: Up to the sequel trilogy, Star Wars scores had utilized eight horns and two tubas, although the Skywalker Symphony recording omits those parts and adds a fifth trumpet. The Phantom Menace and Attack of the Clones also omit the second tuba.) set of timpani, five percussionists, (Note: In Empire Strikes Back, Attack of the Clones and Revenge of the Sith. A second set of timpani is used in the former, and in The Last Jedi.) 89-piece SATB choir, 10 basso profundo singers, 30 boys, 1 Tibetan throat singer, (Note: The full SATB choir is used for the prequels: The Last Jedi only requires a 64-piece Tibetan Throat chanting is used in Revenge of the Sith. The boy choir is used in The Phantom Menace but synthesized in the later two scores. Empire Strikes Back uses a small women choir and Return of the Jedi uses a small male choir. The Force Awakens uses a 24-piece basso profundo orchestra, which is about ten more pieces than would be in a 90-piece SATB choir.) narrator, (Note: For Star Wars: In Concert.) 4 violins divided, 4 violas, 2 violoncellos, 2 contrabasses, 1 harp. (Note: Empire Strikes Back and Return of the Jedi call for two added contrabass parts, and the former also calls for a third harp. The Skywalker Symphony uses a fuller string section, but omits the second harp. The prequels also use the fuller string section.)
- Non-orchestral instruments: Cretan Lyra and cümbüş (I), electric guitar (II), toy piano (VI), kazoo, highland bagpipes, banjo, didgeridoo (VIII). (Note: Williams is not usually keen to stray far from the orchestral instrumentation. The Cretan Lyra and Cumbus are used briefly for diegetic Tatooine music for Phantom Menace and Attack of the Clones, composed by his son, Joseph, and were originally played by one instrumentalist. Williams also recalls "reed flutes" (most likely referring to the ney flute) used in the score, probably for those cues. The prequel scores are not performed live, but seeing as diegetic pieces are not played even in the scores that are performed live, these would probably be omitted under such circumstances, as well. The electric guitar is used in small inserts during the chase through Curoscant in Attack of the Clones (albeit muted in the film on the request of George Lucas). Williams also used three saxophones for the Cantina Band, although those could be doubled by the clarinet players. He also once claimed to have used Kazoos in that sequence, although the liner notes make no mention of it. Didgeridoos are used in the diegetic Caretaker party music, which scores a deleted scene. They are also featured in The Phantom Menace ultimate edition release, where they were originally used as diegetic sound effects, and layered over the soundtrack.)

== Musical themes in the scores ==
John Williams wrote a series of themes and motifs for certain characters and ideas in each of the Star Wars films. The multiple installments allowed Williams to compose some sixty or seventy themes and reprise some of them extensively, continually developing them over a long period of screen time.

Williams introduces a considerable, but manageable number of themes in each episode (seven themes on average), attempting to compose main themes that are distinct, long-lined and memorable. Connections between the themes are formed for narrative purposes or, more generally, in the favour of cohesion. As a result, some of the themes play very often: the Force Theme plays over one hundred times in the series.

Each score can be said to have a "main theme", which is developed and repeated frequently throughout the film, and represents the high and low points of the film itself as much as they do narrative elements within the film: for instance, the frequent use of The Imperial March in Empire Strikes Back. (Note: the theme recurs thirty times or more in a two-hour film.) Besides the main theme and a handful of other principal themes, Williams forged several smaller motifs for each episode, which are generally not as memorable and at times interchangeable. As a result of his compositional process, a large number of incidental musical material and themes that are specific to certain setpieces also occur throughout the piece. Williams had designated the music of the main titles to be the main theme of the series as a whole, but there is not necessarily a main theme for each trilogy. Instead, each trilogy (and to a lesser extent, each film) has its own style or soundscape. (Note: The scores to the original three films are melodic and romantic, as is – largely – the score to The Phantom Menace. However, Episodes II and even III feature much more rhythmic music, and Revenge of the Sith, in particular, is more operatic in its use of choir and even solo vocals. The sequel scores feature another evolution of Williams' musical style, which is less obtrusive, with more lilting musical themes like Rey's theme, reminiscent of some of Williams' work on Harry Potter.)

Williams' Star Wars catalog remains one of the largest collections of leitmotifs in the history of cinema, (Note: Williams themes for Star Wars have been classified based on Williams own comments on the LP release, Mike Matessino's Special Edition Liner notes, and further analyses provided by Doug Adams, John Takis et al. On FilmScoreMonthly. Ancillary sources include Frank Lehman's "Complete Catalogue of the Musical Themes of Star Wars", which includes a lot of "incidental motifs" including stylistic gestures and tracked material.) although – for comparison – it still falls short of Wagner's use of leitmotifs in the Ring Cycle or even Howard Shore's work on the Hobbit and Lord of the Rings films. (Note: Williams wrote some fifty themes for over 19 hours of cinema, with an average of six new themes per film and an average 12 themes used in each film overall. By comparison, Howard Shore wrote over 160 leitmotifs for 21 hours of cinema in the Middle Earth films, of which he uses 40 or more in each film. Richard Wagner wrote 176 leitmotifs for the 15-hour Ring cycle.) Both works feature many more themes for a similar or shorter running time; and use the themes with greater specificity and variation; where Williams prefers to write fewer themes (to allow him to focus on them better) and use them in a more straightforward manner and sometimes, solely for their romantic effect. Shore and Wagner's themes are also inter-related and arranged into sets of subsets of related themes through various melodic or harmonic connections, whereas Williams prefers greater distinction between his themes. (Note: In thematic works such as those of Wagner or Shore, all the leitmotifs which are thematically connected (e.g. all of Alberich's themes or all of the Hobbits' themes) are connected in melody, harmony, key and orchestration, so as to create sets and subsets of inter-connected thematic "families." This allows the composer to introduce new themes later in the work while having the new theme evoke associations that the audience already felt towards existing related themes. Williams' various themes do share certain connections, but they are basic enough as to nullify any attempts to categorize them except in the broadest of strokes, such as themes for the protagonists and themes for the antagonists.)

Williams scores the films one episode at a time and attempts to base each score on new material as much as possible. Therefore, the Imperial March makes no appearance in the original Star Wars, since Williams did not conceive of it until he was scoring The Empire Strikes Back, and the same is true of Across the Stars and The Phantom Menace. Other themes get abandoned, like the Droid motive from The Empire Strikes Back or the original Imperial motives of the original Star Wars. Between trilogies, Williams had often changed his way of using leitmotifs, moving from long-lined melodies in the classic trilogy to shorter, more rhythmic ideas in the prequel trilogy.

=== The use of the themes in the scores ===
Williams does not always use his themes in a strictly narrative sense. In almost each entry, he will occasionally use a theme seemingly at random, purely because its mood fits the scene. Princess Leia's Theme is used for the death of Obi-Wan Kenobi in the original Star Wars, which has little to do with her character even though she is present in the scene. (Note: Since the princess is present at Ben's death, her theme is said to "represents Luke's and the Princess' reaction to leaving Ben behind" although the romantic explanation has been favored by Adams and Michael Matessimo, the author of the special edition liner notes.) Yoda's Theme appears several times during the Cloud City sequences in The Empire Strikes Back. The concert piece Duel of the Fates is used several times throughout the prequel trilogy, appearing over the entire final battle in The Phantom Menace (as opposed to just the lightsaber duel for which it was written); Anakin Skywalker's search for his mother in Attack of the Clones; and the unrelated Yoda and Darth Sidious's duel in Revenge of the Sith. Williams' original composition for the Geonosis Battle Arena in Attack of the Clones, a variation on the Droid Army March, was used for the Utapau assault in Revenge of the Sith. Multiple uses of the Force Theme are also non-thematic.

This also happens through the use of tracked music. Attack of the Clones, the first film to be shot digitally, had major edits made after the scoring process, leading to the inclusion of tracked music over many of the digitally created sequences such as the Droid Factory on Geonosis or the Clone Army's arrival to the battle. These scenes used music such as Yoda's theme or incidental music from The Phantom Menace with little dramatic connection to what is occurring on screen. Musical similarities exist between the final scenes of The Phantom Menace with Finn's confession to Rey in The Force Awakens, probably a result of temp-track choice. (Note: However, some of the music in the later films was always intended to be acquired through tracking of pre-existing material, and some of the tracking choices are very deliberate.) In other cases, the material was not tracked but rather lifted from the original composition and re-recorded, such as in the big action scenes of Return of the Jedi, both of which lift material from the Battle of Yavin and Ben's death. Other composers to have used Williams' themes in spinoff materials have likewise sometimes used them loosely.

Over the long period in which the films were made, many of the themes changed their initial meaning: By the time of The Empire Strikes Back, the Luke Skywalker material and the theme of Old Ben were already rebranded as the "Star Wars Main theme" and "The Force Theme", respectively, by Williams. The Rebel Fanfare (initially, the fanfare of the Blockade Runner) eventually turned into the theme of the Millennium Falcon.

== Themes ==
Listed below are about 67 leitmotifs, based on primarily on Williams own notes and Frank Lehman's extensive catalogue, but also on Doug Adams et al analyses of the scores. Along with two themes Williams composed for Solo and two more for Galaxy's Edge, his work of the series had accrued as many as 71 leitmotifs. The main new theme of each entry is highlighted:

=== Original trilogy ===
==== Star Wars (A New Hope) ====
- "Luke's Theme (Star Wars Main Theme)"
  - "Luke's (Star Wars) Secondary Theme"
- "The Rebel Spaceship Fanfare" (Millennium Falcon Theme)
- "Action Ostinato"
- "Old Ben's Theme (The Force Theme)"
- "Jawa Theme"
- "Princess Leia's Theme" (Note: Williams commented to having originally written this theme as a love theme for Leia and Luke.)
- "Imperial Motif"
- "Death Star Motif"
- "Rebel Victory Theme"

==== The Empire Strikes Back ====
Returning: Star Wars Theme, Star Wars Secondary Theme, Rebel Fanfare, The Force, Princess Leia, Rebel Victory

- "The Imperial March" (Darth Vader's Theme)
- "Han Solo and the Princess"
- "Yoda's Theme": (Note: This theme was also used briefly in Williams' score of E.T. when the figure of Yoda (here a boy in a costume) appeared on screen.)
- "Droids Motif"
- "Cloud City March"
  - "Cloud City Trap"
- "Boba Fett Motif"
- "Dark Side theme"

==== Return of the Jedi ====
Returning: Spaceship Dogfight Motif; Star Wars Theme, Secondary Star Wars Theme, Rebel Fanfare, The Force, Leia, the Imperial March, Death Star Motif, Han Solo and the Princess, Yoda

- "Parade of the Ewoks"
  - "Primitive Ewok Theme"
- "The Emperor's Theme"
- "Jabba The Hutt Theme" (Note: This motif was also re-tracked into the Special Edition of A New Hope from Return of the Jedi.)
- "Brother and Sister Arpeggios"
- "Triumph Fanfare"
- "Trap motif"
- "Luke and Leia Theme"
- First reprisal: "Spaceship Dogfight motif"

=== Prequel trilogy ===
==== The Phantom Menace ====
Returning: Star Wars Theme, Star Wars Secondary Theme, The Rebel Fanfare, The Force Theme, The Imperial March, Yoda's Theme, Jabba's Theme, The Emperor's Theme

- "Duel of the Fates"
- "Young Anakin's Theme"
- "Droid Invasion March"
- "Qui-Gon's Motif"
- "Darth Maul Motif" (Note: Other than the introduction fanfare, this theme is the first "none-pitched theme", based on whispering voices and percussion figures. The latter have been confused for a separate, secondary motif, specifically for Darth Maul or even for his probe droids, but Adams refers to them as mere "drum patterns" that are simply part of the theme.)
- "Jar Jar's Theme"
- "Shmi's Theme"

==== Attack of the Clones ====
Returning: Shmi's Theme; Star Wars Theme, Star Wars Secondary Theme, The Rebel Fanfare, The Force Theme, The Imperial March, The Emperor's Theme, Young Anakin's Theme, Droid Invasion March, Duel of the Fates

- "Across the Stars" (Love Theme from Attack of the Clones)
  - "Across the Stars" (second theme)
- "Courting on Naboo Theme"
- "Separatist Motif"
- "Kamino Motif"
  - "Mystery Motif"

==== Revenge of the Sith ====
Returning: Jedi Funeral Theme, Coruscant Fanfare; Star Wars Theme, Secondary Star Wars Theme, Leia's theme, The Rebel Fanfare, The Force Theme, The Imperial March, The Emperor's Theme, Young Anakin's Theme, Descent, Droid Invasion March, Duel of the Fates, Shmi, Across the Stars, Across the Stars (embryonic), Dark Side

- "Battle of the Heroes"
- "General Grievous' Motif"
- "Lament for Anakin Theme"
- First reprisal: "Funeral Theme"
- First reprisal: "Coruscant Fanfare"

=== Sequel trilogy ===
==== The Force Awakens ====
Returning: Star Wars Theme, Secondary Star Wars Theme, Millennium Falcon (Note: The Rebel Fanfare is often (but not always) used in the sequel trilogy scores with the Millennium Falcon. In his score to Solo, John Powell continued this trend, having said that in talking to Williams the former claimed that it was the motif's intended association all along.), The Force theme, Leia's Theme, The Imperial March, Han Solo and the Princess

- "Rey's Theme"
  - Rey's Chime Figure
  - Rey's Gallop Figure
- "Kylo Ren's Fanfare"
  - "Kylo Ren's Conflicted Motif"
- "First Order Theme"
- "Map Motif"
- "March of the Resistance"
- "Tension figure"
- "Pursuit Ostinato"
- "Poe Dameron's Motif"
- "Snoke's Theme" (Note: This theme is written for voices in the Basso Profundo range, and has drawn tenuous comparisons to Palpatine's Teachings, although the latter is based rather on overtone singing.)
- "Jedi Steps"

==== The Last Jedi ====
Returning: Star Wars Theme, Secondary Star Wars Theme, Millennium Falcon, The Force Theme, Leia's Theme, Yoda's Theme, Luke and Leia, Han Solo and the Princess, The Imperial March, Spaceship Dogfight Motif, Death Star motif, The Emperor's Theme, Poe's Theme, Rey's Themes, Kylo Ren's themes, First Order, Tension figure, Snoke's Theme, Jedi Steps

- "Rose Tico's Theme"
- "Luke's Island Motif"
- "Rebel Desperation Motif"

==== The Rise of Skywalker ====
Returning: Star Wars Theme, Secondary Star Wars Theme, Millennium Falcon, The Force Theme, Leia's Theme, Han Solo and the Princess, The Imperial March, The Emperor's Theme, Poe's Theme, Rey's Themes, Kylo Ren's themes, March of the Resistance, Luke and Leia, Yoda's Theme, Dark Side, Tension figure

- "The Trio Theme"
- "The Rise of Skywalker (Victory) Theme"
- "Anthem of Evil (Psalm of the Sith)"
- "Poe's Heroics Theme"
- "Sith Artifacts"
- "Knights of Ren Motif"

== Incidental motifs ==
Since neither Williams nor his office ever provided a full list of the leitmotifs used in every Star Wars film, there is some controversy around the exact number of themes, with some taking an inclusive approach that identifies various leitmotifs, even where the composer probably never intended for, and others taking an exclusive, reductive approach.

Some of the more inclusive analyses identify themes that do not actually recur either in discrete cues nor even strewn across one long stretch of music. This is the result of Williams' propensity (in these scores and otherwise) to write material that is either melodic, rhythmic, harmonic or timbral specifically to an individual setpiece or non-recurring plot element in the film, such as The Battle of Hoth, the Chase through Coruscant, or The Battle of Crait. These individual pieces of music – whether they consist of a full melody, ostinati, diegetic pieces or a certain timbre – have sometimes been described as having thematic significance, occasionally (in fleeting comments) even by Williams himself, but since they do not recur in a different part of the narrative, nor are transformed from or into another motif, they do not comply with the definition of a leitmotif.

Even when some of these figures do recur, it is often unclear whether they are substantial enough to be assigned with thematic significance, as these instances often includes material that is incidental in nature, such as several figures used in the finale of The Empire Strikes Back; material that is purely rhythmic or timbral like various "bouncing" horn figures for Luke's landspeeder search in the original Star Wars, material that is of a generic nature, such as his use of "mournful homophonic" choir in The Last Jedi for climactic moments; or material that is part of Williams' stylistic choices as a composer, more than a thematic statement unique to the series. For instance, his use of tritones often denotes mystery, a device he uses for the droids landing on Tatooine and again in the concert arrangement of "The Throne Room."

In fact, sometimes the supposedly recurring material is similar, but not in fact identical. A good example would be the variety of gestures relating to the dark side, following a piece of music used in the opera-house scene. Lehamn however clarifies that those alleged following statements are "similar but inexact" to the earlier gesture.

Sometimes, the recurring material is question is not part of the original composition but is rather tracked after-the-fact, or at least lifted, from existing material into a different section of the film, or from material that is recapitulated in a concert piece or end-credits suite. This includes the Podracing fanfare and the ostinato accompaniment of the Rebel Fanfare, which otherwise does not appear isolated from the unabridged theme more than once; the mournful writing for French horn at Shmi's funeral, the Arena March from Attack of the Clones etc.

== Themes in the Anthology films ==
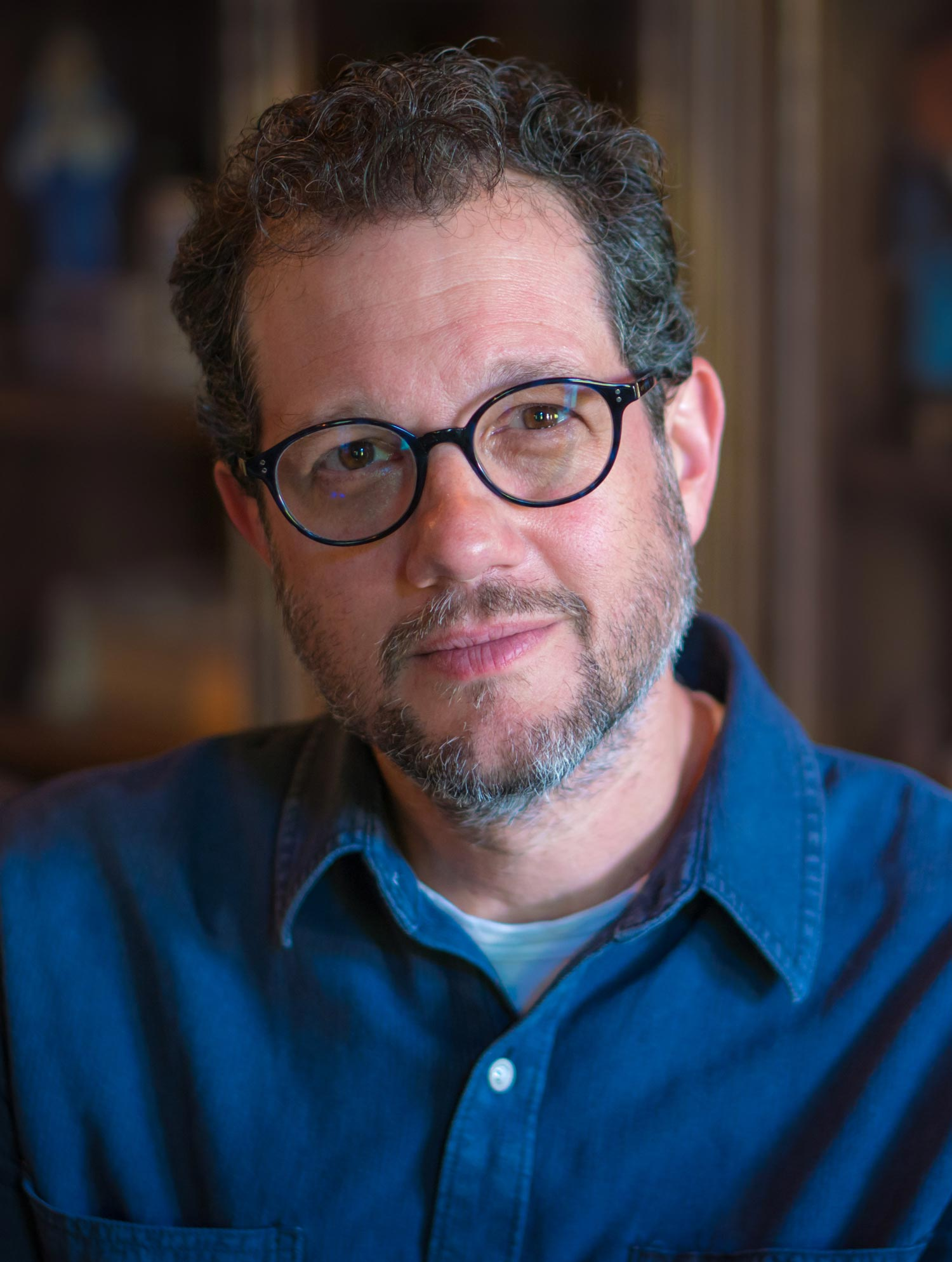
Michael Giacchino, the composer of Rogue One

The first Star Wars Anthology score for Rogue One, written by Michael Giacchino, utilizes several themes (and recurring interstitial material) from John Williams, mostly for their Romantic sweep (such as The Force Theme and hints of the Main Theme). It has its own catalog of themes, independent from Williams' material, including a new, third theme for the Empire, although Giacchino also quotes both the original Imperial Motif and The Imperial March.

=== Rogue One ===
Returning: Luke's Theme, Rebel Fanfare, The Force Theme, Leia's Theme, Imperial Motif, Death Star Motif, The Imperial March

- Jyn's Theme
- Hope Theme
- Guardians of the Whills Theme
- Imperial Theme (Krennic's Theme)

=== Solo ===
For Solo, John Williams wrote and recorded a concert arrangement for a new theme for Han Solo. In the process of composing the theme, Williams ended up using two separate ideas, each conveying a different aspect of the character, and went as far as to spot the film for places to use each motif; all other leitmotifs and other material were written and adapted by John Powell, the main composer for the film.

Returning: Spaceship Dogfight motif, Star Wars Theme, Millennium Falcon theme, Duel of the Fates, The Imperial March, The Imperial motif, Death Star Motif, The Asteroid Field, Imperial Cruiser Pursuit, Droids Motif

By John Williams:

- Han Solo's Theme
  - "Han Solo's Searching theme"

By John Powell:

- Chewbacca's Theme
- Han and Qi'Ra's Love Theme
- L3'S Theme
- Crew theme
- Enfys Nest Theme
- Crime Syndicate Motif (Vos's Theme)

== Concert suites ==
Instead of offering a full recording release of a particular film, Williams typically releases a condensed score on album, (Note: The first three scores received an expanded Anthology release and finally an effectively complete release in 1996. The Phantom Menace was also released in an "Ultimate Edition", featuring a lot of added cues but also multiple instances of tracked music, hence lacking a lot of original music that was not used as intended by the composer in the finished film. The Last Jedi received an isolated score release, albeit again not including unused material and maintaining tracked sequences.) in which the music is arranged out of the film order and more within the veins of a concert program. These album releases typically include several concert suites, written purely for the end credits or the album itself, where a specific theme is developed continuously throughout the piece. Williams also re-edited some of his existing cues after the fact in order to "concertize" theme on the behest of conductors such as Charles Gerhardt. Five of the eight films also have unique credit suites that feature alternate concert arrangements of themes and/or a medley of the main themes of a particular film.

=== Original Trilogy ===
Star Wars Episode IV: A New Hope

- "Main Title"
- "Princess Leia's Theme"
- "The Little People"
- "Cantina Band"
- "Here They Come!"
- "The Battle"
- "Throne Room and End Title"

Star Wars Episode V: The Empire Strikes Back

- "The Imperial March"
- "Yoda's Theme"
- "Han Solo and the Princess (1980)"
- "Han Solo and the Princess (2018)" (Note: While the original track is a film cue, Williams created a new suite based on it in 2018.)

Star Wars Episode VI: Return of the Jedi

- "Parade of the Ewoks"
- "Luke and Leia"
- "Jabba the Hutt"
- "The Forest Battle"

=== Prequel Trilogy ===
Star Wars Episode I: The Phantom Menace

- "Duel of the Fates"
- "Anakin's Theme"
- "The Adventures of Jar Jar"
- "The Flag Parade"

Star Wars Episode II: Attack of the Clones

- "Across the Stars" (Note: There's an alternate presentation over the end-credits, featuring a hint of Anakin's theme as an ending coda.)

Star Wars Episode III: Revenge of the Sith

- "Battle of the Heroes"

=== Sequel Trilogy ===
Star Wars Episode VII: The Force Awakens

- "Rey's Theme"
- "March of the Resistance"
- "Adagio" (Note: Features a variation of "The Starkiller", premiered in 2019.)
- "Scherzo for X-Wings" (Note: Features a variation of Luke's theme.)
- "The Jedi Steps"

Star Wars Episode VIII: The Last Jedi

- "The Rebellion is Reborn" (Note: This suite uniquely features not one but two of the three thematic ideas that make up the entire score: Rose's theme, and Luke's Island motif, notably stressing the former.)

Star Wars Episode IX: The Rise of Skywalker

- "The Rise of Skywalker"
- "The Speeder Chase"
- "Anthem of Evil"

=== From the spin-offs ===
From Rogue One

- "Jyn Erso and Hope Suite"
- "The Imperial Suite"
- "The Guardians of the Whills Suite"

From Solo

- "The Adventures of Han" (Note: This is a suite of Han's themes which was written by John Williams, and the suite was arranged and conducted by Williams, as well.)

== Diegetic music ==
Diegetic music is music "that occurs as part of the action (rather than as background), and can be heard by the film's characters". In addition to the orchestral scope that was brought on by John Williams' musical score, the Star Wars franchise also features many distinguishing diegetic songs that enrich the detail of the audio mise-en-scène. Some of this diegetic music was written by John Williams; some by his son, Joseph; and some by various other people.

From Star Wars

- "Cantina Band" and "Cantina Band #2". Written by John Williams, it is played in the Mos Eisley Cantina on Tatooine. It is written for solo trumpet, three saxophones, clarinet, Fender Rhodes piano, steel drum, synthesizer and various percussion, including boobams and toms. According to the Star Wars Customizable Card Game, the diegetic title for the first Cantina band piece is "Mad About Me". The liner notes for the 1997 Special Edition release of the Star Wars soundtrack describe the concept behind these works as "several creatures in a future century finding some 1930's Benny Goodman swing band music ... and how they might attempt to interpret it". This piece also appears on an all the outtake easter eggs on the Episode I and Episode II and on the bonus disc of the 2004 original trilogy DVD set.

From Return of the Jedi

- "Jabba's Baroque Recital". Mozart-esque John Williams composition (featuring a synthesized harpsichord) played while 3PO and R2 first arrive and play Jabba the message from Luke Skywalker.
- "Lapti Nek". Written by Joseph Williams (John Williams' son) and translated into Huttese, this is played by the Max Rebo Band in Jabba the Hutt's palace (in the original cut of the movie). (Note: Later used in the Star Wars Galaxy of Adventures episode "Jabba the Hutt – Galactic Gangster".)
- "Jedi Rocks" (composed by Jerry Hey). This was composed to replace "Lapti Nek" for the 1997 Special Edition of the film.
- "Max Rebo Band Jams". Heard twice in the film, once after Jabba sends the Wookiee Chewbacca to jail, and again on Jabba's sail barge Khetanna (hence its title). A recording of the first can be found on the official Star Wars Soundboards.
- "Ewok Feast" and "Part of the Tribe". By John Williams. Heard when Luke and company were captured by the Ewoks and brought to their treehouses.
- "Ewok Celebration". The Victory Song, whose lyrics were written by Joseph Williams, can be heard at the end of the original release of Return of the Jedi.
- "Victory Celebration". By John Williams. The Victory Song at the end of the Return of the Jedi 1997 re-edition.

From The Phantom Menace

- "Tatooine Street Music". Joseph Williams wrote four separate pieces of unusual, vaguely Eastern sounding source music for the streets of Mos Espa, featuring a player on Cretan Lyra and Cumbus, and a solo, wailing female vocal.
- "Augie's Municipal Band". By John Williams. Music played during the peace parade at the end of the film, it is a sped-up, attenuated trumpet and boy choir composition. It is closely related to the Emperor's Theme, but is not an outright quote of it.

From Attack of the Clones

- "Dex's Diner"
- "Unknown Episode II Source Cue". A second source cue is credited to Joseph Williams' name for Episode II, but is not heard in the film.
- "Arena Percussion". Originally meant to accompany the Droid Factory sequence, Ben Burtt's attempt at composition is instead shifted to the arena, replacing the predominantly unused John Williams cue "Entrance of the Monsters."

From The Force Awakens

- "Jabba Flow" and "Dobra Doompa". Written by Lin-Manuel Miranda and J. J. Abrams, these songs were played at Maz Kanata's castle.

From The Last Jedi

- "Canto Bight". Written by John Williams, it appears when Finn and Rose first arrive to the casino planet of Canto Bight. It is written in the style of big-band jazz and is stylistically akin to the "Cantina Band" music from Star Wars. The track features solo alto saxophone, two baritone saxophones, solo clarinet, trombones, kazoo, muted trumpets, (Note: The Kazoos were inserted into the mutes to produce a nasal sound.) Fender Rhodes piano, bass, synthesizers, steel drums, and various percussion, including washboards and goblet drums. The track briefly quotes "Aquarela do Brasil" (which also features hi-hat and ride cymbals) by Ary Barroso as a reference to the 1985 Terry Gilliam film Brazil, and includes a brief piano statement of Williams' and Johnny Mercer's theme from The Long Goodbye.
- "Caretaker party music": source cue of an unknown composition (possibly by Williams), which features highland bagpipes and a didgeridoo, and accompanies a deleted scene from the film.

From The Rise of Skywalker

- "Lido Hey": Written by Lin-Manuel Miranda and J. J. Abrams and performed by Shag Kava, a musical moniker for Miranda and Abrams. Plays as the main characters participate and traverse the Festival of Ancestors on the desert planet Pasaana.
- "Oma's Place": Performed by Ricky Tinez and J. J. Abrams. Plays as the main characters enter a bar owned by Oma Tres (featuring composer John Williams in a cameo role) on the planet Kijimi.

From Solo: A Star Wars Story

- "Chicken in the Pot". Written by John Powell, it is performed on Dryden Vos' yacht when Solo reunites with Qi'ra and first meets Vos.

== Reception ==
=== Accolades ===
In 2005, the 1977 soundtrack for Star Wars was voted as the "most memorable film score of all time" by the American Film Institute in the list AFI's 100 Years of Film Scores, based on the assessment of a jury of over 500 artists, composers, musicians, critics and historians from the film industry.

Year	Title	Award	Recipient	Result
Films
1978	A New Hope	Academy Award for Best Original Score	John Williams	Won
1978	A New Hope	Golden Globe Award for Best Original Score	John Williams	Won
1978	A New Hope	BAFTA Award for Best Film Music	John Williams	Won
1978	A New Hope	Grammy Award for Best Instrumental Composition	John Williams	Won
1978	A New Hope	Grammy Award for Best Original Score Written for a Motion Picture or a Television Special	John Williams	Won
1978	A New Hope	Grammy Award for Best Pop Instrumental Performance	John Williams	Won
1978	A New Hope	Saturn Award for Best Music	John Williams	Won
1981	The Empire Strikes Back	Academy Award for Best Original Score	John Williams	Nominated
1981	The Empire Strikes Back	BAFTA Award for Best Film Music	John Williams	Won
1981	The Empire Strikes Back	Grammy Award for Best Instrumental Composition	John Williams	Won
1981	The Empire Strikes Back	Grammy Award for Best Original Score Written for a Motion Picture or a Television Special	John Williams	Won
1981	The Empire Strikes Back	Saturn Award for Best Music	John Williams	Nominated
1984	Return of the Jedi	Academy Award for Best Original Score	John Williams	Nominated
1984	Return of the Jedi	Golden Globe Award for Best Original Score	John Williams	Nominated
1984	Return of the Jedi	Grammy Award for Best Original Score Written for a Motion Picture or a Television Special	John Williams	Nominated
1984	Return of the Jedi	Saturn Award for Best Music	John Williams	Nominated
2000	The Phantom Menace	Grammy Award for Best Score Soundtrack Album for Motion Picture, Television or Other Visual Media	John Williams	Nominated
2000	The Phantom Menace	Grammy Award for Best Instrumental Composition	John Williams	Nominated
2003	Attack of the Clones	Saturn Award for Best Music	John Williams	Nominated
2006	Revenge of the Sith	Best Score Soundtrack Album for Motion Picture, Television or Other Visual Media	John Williams	Nominated
2006	Revenge of the Sith	Saturn Award for Best Music	John Williams	Nominated
2016	The Force Awakens	Academy Award for Best Original Score	John Williams	Nominated
2016	The Force Awakens	BAFTA Award for Best Film Music	John Williams	Won
2016	The Force Awakens	Grammy Award for Best Score Soundtrack for Visual Media	John Williams	Nominated
2016	The Force Awakens	Saturn Award for Best Music	John Williams	Won
2017	Rogue One	Saturn Award for Best Music	Michael Giacchino	Nominated
2018	The Last Jedi	Academy Award for Best Original Score	John Williams	Nominated
2018	The Last Jedi	Grammy Award for Best Score Soundtrack for Visual Media	John Williams	Nominated
2018	The Last Jedi	Saturn Award for Best Music	John Williams	Nominated
2019	Solo: A Star Wars Story	Grammy Award for Best Instrumental Composition ("Mine Mission")	John Williams, John Powell	Nominated
2020	The Rise of Skywalker	Academy Award for Best Original Score	John Williams	Nominated
2020	The Rise of Skywalker	BAFTA Award for Best Film Music	John Williams	Nominated
Other media
2020	Star Wars: Galaxy's Edge	Grammy Award for Best Instrumental Composition ("Star Wars: Galaxy's Edge Symphonic Suite")	John Williams	Won

=== Certifications ===
The soundtracks to both Star Wars and Star Wars Episode I: The Phantom Menace have been certified Platinum by the Recording Industry Association of America, for shipments of at least 1 million units, with the albums for The Empire Strikes Back and Star Wars Episode II: Attack of the Clones being certified Gold (500,000 units). The British Phonographic Industry certified Star Wars and Episode I as Gold for shipments of over 100,000 units in the UK.
