= Niamos! =

"Niamos!" (Morlana Club Mix Galaxy Mix Coruscant Lounge Mix Brasso Chandrilan Club Mix)

Song

from the album Andor (soundtrack) Andor: Season 2 (soundtrack)
- Released: October 21, 2022
- Genre: Synth-pop
- Label: Disney
- Songwriters: Nicholas Britell; Brandon Roberts (Brasso and Chandrilan Club Mix)

Niamos! is a synth-pop song from the soundtrack of the Star Wars television series Andor. The track appears several times across the episodes in different mixes, one alternatively titled Brasso. The track was composed by Nicholas Britell for the first season and remixed by Brandon Roberts for the second. Britell previously soundtracked Succession. Roberts' remix in season 2 for the scene of Mon Mothma dancing wildly to the track went viral.

== Appearances ==
"Niamos!" first appears in the opening scene of episode one as diegetic music, where the title character Cassian Andor visits a nightclub brothel on the planet Morlana One. The track "Morlana Drop" also plays. The Morlana Club Mix, which appears on volume one of the Andor soundtrack has an industrial sound. It next appears, "slowed down and warped", as background music at the Chandrilan embassy on the Imperial planet Coruscant, where Senator Mon Mothma first involves her childhood friend Tay Kolma in financing the rebellion. It is next heard during an aerial shot introducing Cassian's visit in episode seven, "Announcement", to the resort planet Niamos, the track name's origin and referred to by fans as "Space Miami" and "Venice Beach Planet". This is the "Galaxy Mix".

In the season 2 episode "Harvest", a "party banger" EDM remix with techno beats is again diagetically played, this time by a speaker droid - a hovering "disco ball" - at the wedding on Chandrila of Mothma's daughter. The wedding crowd dances in a loose choreography and periodically chants "Niamos".

This is a pivotal scene where the nascent rebellion against the Empire is moving from an idea to a reality and beginning to have serious personal consequences for Mothma: marrying off her daughter to the son of a disreputable financer and realising that Kolma is about to be assassinated to keep him from revealing Mothma's rebel involvement after he tried to blackmail her. Mothma looks behind herself in misery, before drunkenly dancing ferociously to the music, physically showing her internal chaos and impressing or unnerving her husband in a "powerfully tragic sequence". Mothma actor Genevieve O'Reilly described the scene as a "crescendo", saying, "Perhaps from the outside it looks like this beautiful Renaissance painting moment, but actually it's a woman trying to exorcize the chaos that's in her brain ... she's dancing to keep herself from screaming." The music is used to tie storylines together: it continues to play as the scene intercuts with Cassian failing to save his friend Brasso from Imperial forces, Mothma's cousin Vel watching her former girlfriend Cinta flying away with Kolma to his death, and Bix fighting off attempted rape by an Imperial officer. The celebratory sounding music is a dark, dramatic irony, with Mothma's dancing also contrasting with the "thousand-yard stares" of the characters fleeing Mina-Rau in Cassian's stolen TIE fighter.

It last appears as elevator music in a hospital on Coruscant.

=== In-universe ===
In-universe, "Niamos!" is a Top 40 galactic hit, equivalent to the real-world hit "Macarena", making the Star Wars universe "feel more real and fleshed-out", with the wedding mix the version that fills dance floors. Slash Film commented that "Having "Niamos!" be a song that's just as popular on the titular Outer Rim planet as it is on Chandrila in the Core Worlds is a fantastic way of connecting the vastly distant locales of the galaxy far, far away."

== Composition ==
Show creator Tony Gilroy said the song was initially written by Britell for the episode introducing the planet Niamos, saying "Let's have something Miami". It was then remixed for other episodes, including by Brandon Roberts for the wedding scene. Britell's recollection was first scoring the piece for the Morlana club scene, along with shorter diagetic pieces, to give an "intensity and grittiness", and later choosing it for the "party planet" Niamos flyover. Roberts described Brittell's "lilting melody" as having a wobbling and uncanny theremin-like quality. Roberts took over scoring from Britell for season two after Britell's father died and due to scheduling problems. Because they found it difficult to find music for the show, Britell decided to remix the music in the background for the opening brothel scene. They used its appearances as "little Easter eggs".

Gilroy realised the song was "a big wraparound that sort of ties everything together" and decided to use a "real hardcore Tarzana, California, EDM mix" in the climactic wedding scene. Roberts aimed to "hype it up [with] everything from percussion to synthesized elements to changing the actual balance of things." Gilroy described timing the song and its beats so that it fitted the rhythm of the scene, trying several different edits. The narrative arc it plays over lasts at least 15 minutes and they needed to "field test" that the track could carry the scene.

== Analysis ==
The Bryant Review identified "Niamos!" as a leitmotif of change as each portrayed character is drawn deeper into the Rebellion. Similarly, the British Fantasy Society commented on the song "winding like a snake" through the series. Collider said "Niamos!" is an "anthem to decadence" in its use on its namesake planet, the enjoyment of the resort goers juxtaposed with Imperial oppression; Polygon said of the wedding scene that "'Niamos!' here isn't being used for freewheeling club bacchanalia, at least not for Mon". Both in "Announcement" and "Harvest", "Niamos!" is used to signal a major shift for the characters. Vulture called its use in the wedding scene "the dramatic highlight of the episode". ScreenRant said the wedding music was a "very fun callback" to the use in the first season.

The use of synth-pop and diagetic music was noted in comparison to the usual orchestral music of Star Wars and the "brassy, vaguely spacey faux-jazz" of the Max Rebo Band (canonically known as Jizz), alongside other diagetic music in the series such as the funeral march on Ferrix.

== Release and reception ==
On the season one soundtrack - released in October 2022 - alongside the "Morlana Club Mix", two more mixes appear: the "Coruscant Lounge Mix" and the "Galaxy Mix". Before the Chandrilan wedding version, the "Morlana Club Mix" was the most popular. Entertainment Weekly rated that mix as the 11th best piece of Star Wars music in 2023, "its first danceable club track". Polygon said its "thumping synths and piercing, discordant melodies" were "the song of the year... a barn-burner". Gizmodo said it has a "hypnotic beat". Vulture called it the "space equivalent of Daft Punk", saying it "instantly entered into the pantheon of my all-time favorite songs to request the DJ play". A lofi version was released by Disney on YouTube in May 2024.

External videos
- One Hour of Dancing Mon Mothma | Andor Season 2 | Disney+ presents Mothma dancing to the song as an hour-long loop, YouTube video from Star Wars' channel

The Chandrilan wedding mix proved popular among fans. The initially released official version was only 1:13 long and a musician called Jeremy Brauns released a four-minute version on YouTube and Spotify in April 2025. Shortly after, Disney released an hour-long loop of Mothma dancing to "Niamos!" on the Star Wars YouTube channel, receiving 200,000 views on the first day. Jason Kottke compared it to a similar loop of Marvel character Zemo dancing and noted fan punning, like "Many Bothans died to bring us this beat" and "Sir, we have located the Rebel bass". Gizmodo called the wedding version "one of the show’s breakout cultural moments." Vanity Fair said it is an "unexpected anthem".

The wedding version is also known as "Brasso", after the character whose death it plays over. The "Brasso" version on the season two soundtrack, released on Spotify and iTunes, includes an orchestral buildup to the main track. Gilroy said in May 2025 that he wanted to release the audio files (stems) to allow fan remixes. A full "Chandrilan Club Mix", without the orchestral introduction and including the "Ni-a-mos" shout, was released on YouTube in June 2025. Many remixes and memes were shared on social media of other people "spiraling out" to the music and of Mothma dancing to other tracks, which were officially welcomed: "Rather than dispatching a fleet of copyright takedowns, Lucasfilm has embraced the remixes and homages." The crew and actors shared them with each other.

All music is composed by Nicholas Britell.

Andor: Vol. 1 (Episodes 1–4)
No.	Title	Length
3.	"Niamos! (Morlana Club Mix)"	1:42

Andor: Vol. 2 (Episodes 5–8)
No.	Title	Length
17.	"Niamos! (Coruscant Lounge Mix)"	2:27
19.	"Niamos! (Galaxy Mix)"	1:08

All music is composed by Brandon Roberts and Nicholas Britell.

Andor: Season 2 – Vol. 1 (Episodes 1–3) (Original Score)
No.	Title	Length
19.	"Brasso"	2:58

Title	Performer(s)	Length
"NIAMOS! (Chandrilian Club Mix)"	Nicholas Britell, Brandon Roberts	4:15
