= Obi-Wan Kenobi (disambiguation) =

Obi-Wan Kenobi may refer to:

- Obi-Wan Kenobi
- Obi-Wan Kenobi (miniseries)
  - Obi-Wan Kenobi (soundtrack)
- Obi-Wan Kenobi: The Patterson Cut
- Obi-Wan Kenobi Street
- Star Wars: Obi-Wan, a 2001 video game
