= The Book Thief (soundtrack) =

The Book Thief (Original Motion Picture Soundtrack)

Film score by John Williams
- Released: November 5, 2013
- Recorded: September 20, 2013–October 6, 2013
- Studio: Newman Scoring Stage, Twentieth Century Fox Studios
- Genre: Film score
- Length: 52:03
- Label: Sony Classical Records; Fox Music
- Producer: John Williams

John Williams chronology
Lincoln (2012)	The Book Thief (2013)	Star Wars: The Force Awakens (2015)

The Book Thief (Original Motion Picture Soundtrack) is the soundtrack to the 2013 film The Book Thief based on the 2005 novel of the same name by Markus Zusak. Released by Sony Classical Records and Fox Music on November 5, 2013, the album featured an original score composed and conducted by John Williams, his first non-Spielberg collaboration since 2005. (Note: Williams' scored for the Alfonso Cuarón-directed film Harry Potter and the Prisoner of Azkaban (2004), which was his last score for a non-Spielberg film. Since then, he consecutively worked with Spielberg's directorials.)

== Background ==
Ken Blancato admitted that Williams knew the film being made and saw the film before him, admitting his strong interest in the film. The film was scored at the Newman Scoring Stage at the 20th Century Fox Studios, instead of his Sony Scoring Stage where Williams usually recorded his films. Initially, Blancato wanted to score the film in London as "he wanted to do it closer to home and have him with us". Blancato felt it was "mesmerizing to go and listen to this process take place".

== Reception ==
Music critic Jonathan Broxton wrote: "The Book Thief illustrates and brings out the emotions in the listener and the viewer with grace and sincerity, never overwhelming them, allowing the audience to feel the story at it unfolds. Simultaneously, the musicality and compositional excellence in the score illustrate just how well Williams understands musical storytelling and the importance of structure and narrative in film music. It's the essence of good cinema, and just proves once more why Williams is one of the greatest film composers who ever lived." James Southall of Movie Wave commented "There's nothing groundbreaking in The Book Thief. It's well-worn territory. It sounds like you expect it to sound. And that means it sounds good. Williams has always been a master at telling a story through his music; he tells this one beautifully. There's heartache and beauty, side by side; agony and ecstasy. Every spine-tingling chill is eventually contrasted with one of warmth. Class never ages and Williams has a class in abundance; as his forays into film music become more occasional, they become all the more special."

Danny Gonzalez of Examiner commented "The Book Thief isn't in the league of Williams' most accomplished works but it certainly holds a major candle to those works because it's thematic, lush and full of energy that really is missing from a lot of today's music in general and in particular the film music genre. Classical music fans will also enjoy this score on its own merits because it does play at times like a full classical composition that does stand out outside of the film that it was written for. The Book Thief is one of my favorite scores of this year and certainly will be an Oscar contender come January when the Academy Award nominations will be announced. This one really does like a score that may garner Williams another golden statuette as well." Daniel Schweiger of Film Music Magazine said "Even though he's past 80 years old, John Williams remains at the top of the Hollywood game with a sense of melodic freshness and innocence that's no more resonant in a "Book Thief" that's likely to reduce listeners to stealing handkerchiefs. But as always, it's sweeping emotion that's honestly earned through dramatic subtlety and gorgeous, heart-rending themes, of which "The Book Thief' has volumes. It's a veritable library of the greatest dramatic film scoring text of the last century, accomplished with no shortage of vitality as Williams continues to enthrall into the next epoch."

Stephen Farber of The Hollywood Reporter commented "uncharacteristically understated score is one of his more effective in recent years". Dennis Harvey of Variety called it as "excellent score", while Richard Corliss of Time called it as "subtly melodic" Stephen Holden of The New York Times wrote "John Williams's score — a quieter, more somber echo of his music for Schindler's List — lends the film an unearned patina of solemnity". Kaye Don of Den of Geek commented "the score by living legend John Williams is lyrical, subtle and a shift from the epic fanfares he is known for."

== Accolades ==
Award	Category	Nominee	Result
Academy Awards	Best Original Score	John Williams	Nominated
British Academy Film Awards	Best Film Music	John Williams	Nominated
Golden Globe Awards	Best Original Score	John Williams	Nominated
Grammy Awards	Best Instrumental Composition	John Williams	Won
International Film Music Critics Association	Best Original Score for a Drama Film	John Williams	Nominated
International Film Music Critics Association	Film Music Composition of the Year	John Williams	Nominated
Satellite Awards	Best Original Score	John Williams	Nominated
Saturn Awards	Best Music	John Williams	Nominated

== Track listing ==
No.	Title	Length
1.	"One Small Fact"	1:46
2.	"The Journey to Himmel Street"	1:48
3.	"New Parents and a New Home"	1:33
4.	"Ilsa's Library"	2:21
5.	"The Snow Fight"	1:01
6.	"Learning to Read"	2:48
7.	"Book Burning"	2:52
8.	"I Hate Hitler!"	2:06
9.	"Max and Liesel"	1:11
10.	"The Train Station"	2:16
11.	"Revealing the Secret"	4:11
12.	"Foot Race"	1:20
13.	"The Visitor at Himmel Street"	2:02
14.	"Learning to Write"	2:07
15.	"The Departure of Max"	2:32
16.	"Jellyfish"	2:08
17.	"Rescuing the Book"	1:55
18.	"Writing to Mama"	2:42
19.	"Max Lives"	1:31
20.	"Rudy is Taken"	2:00
21.	"Finale"	2:48
22.	"The Book Thief"	7:05
Total length:		52:03
