= The BFG (soundtrack) =

The BFG (Original Motion Picture Soundtrack)

Film score by John Williams
- Released: July 1, 2016
- Recorded: 2016
- Studio: Sony Scoring Stage; Culver City, California
- Genre: Film score
- Length: 1:04:33
- Label: Walt Disney
- Producer: John Williams

John Williams chronology
| Star Wars: The Force Awakens (2015) | The BFG (2016) | Star Wars: The Last Jedi (2017) |

The BFG (Original Motion Picture Soundtrack) is the score album for the 2016 film of the same name, directed by Steven Spielberg. It featured a musical score composed and conducted by Spielberg's frequent collaborator John Williams and was released on July 1, 2016 (the same date as the film's release) by Walt Disney Records.

== Background ==
John Williams could not score for Spielberg's war drama film Bridge of Spies (2015), citing health issues and handed the scoring duties to Thomas Newman, but agreed to compose for The BFG. While writing the score, Williams compared the film to "a child's ballet where there are dances involved," elaborating that it "tries to capture dreams with his net and does something that almost looks like a Ray Bolger or Fred Astaire dance; it is an amazingly musical and choreographic sequence which required the orchestra to do things that are more associated with musical films." Williams found similarities with the scoring of Home Alone, due to the "lightheartedness and fun of it", further admitting that writing music for the film "was really an opportunity to compose and orchestrate a little children's fantasy for orchestra."

Williams began recording the score during February 2016 and completed that June. During the sessions, he apparently recorded 90 minutes of the score at the Sony Scoring Stage in California. 85-members from the Los Angeles Philharmonic performed the score, including the virtuosic parts for the flute section, as Williams "to animate these little dreams that flit about the screen with flutes and harps and wispy harmonies". At an interview published in the summer issue of D23's (Disney fan club) official magazine, Spielberg complimented Williams' score saying "Every moment is accompanied by a little bit of a musical reminder that there is another layer of story being told."

== Track listing ==
All music is composed by John Williams.

| No. | Title | Length |
|---|---|---|
| 1. | "Overture" | 1:18 |
| 2. | "The Witching Hour" | 4:41 |
| 3. | "To Giant Country" | 2:33 |
| 4. | "Dream Country" | 10:10 |
| 5. | "Sophie's Nightmare" | 1:57 |
| 6. | "Building Trust" | 3:25 |
| 7. | "Fleshlumpeater" | 1:37 |
| 8. | "Dream Jars" | 3:30 |
| 9. | "Frolic" | 1:44 |
| 10. | "Blowing Dreams" | 3:46 |
| 11. | "Snorting and Sniffing" | 2:13 |
| 12. | "Sophie's Future" | 2:30 |
| 13. | "There Was a Boy" | 3:30 |
| 14. | "The Queen's Dream" | 3:08 |
| 15. | "The Boy's Drawings" | 3:05 |
| 16. | "Meeting the Queen" | 3:00 |
| 17. | "Giants Netted" | 2:03 |
| 18. | "Finale" | 2:14 |
| 19. | "Sophie and the BFG" | 8:09 |
| Total length: | | 64:33 |

== Reception ==
Critical reviews praised John Williams' musical score for its lightheartedness and being different from Williams' previous compositions implemented in his style. Several websites including Collider (Matt Goldberg) and Consequence Of Sound (Allison Shoemaker) called the score as "playful" and "Williams-esque".

Jonathan Broxton of Movie Music UK wrote, "The BFG is delightful from start to finish: it has a strong and memorable main theme, with a palpable and appropriate sense of magic and wonderment, and a warm and nostalgic glow of friendship and tenderness. Not only that, the entire score is a master class in writing for woodwinds, which in and of itself should be wholly celebrated, especially considering the state of mainstream Hollywood film music these days." Mfiles.com wrote "As much as anything else, it's Williams' collaborative nature with the likes of Spielberg and others that has secured him as a legendary figure of music, a keen dramatist always respecting a filmmaker's vision yet always looking to enhance it as well. The BFG may be a relatively minor work as far as Williams is concerned, but its artistry, craft and sheer level of class put it in a completely different league to everything else."

James Southall of Movie Wave wrote, "There's no doubt whatsoever as to just how luxurious this music is – sheer class simply oozes from every pore, as ever with John Williams [...] Listening to an hour of new John Williams music in 2016 is a great thing to be able to do, something to be treasured, and even if it's not an outstanding work by his standards, it's still something to which the majority of his colleagues could only aspire to" and concluded "it's impossible to deny its quality and the enjoyment inherent in hearing its unrelenting pleasantness." Filmtracks.com wrote "It's easy to understand why The BFG will leave some listeners cold, because it lacks the sections of elongated tonal resonance and powerful bass region presence that grace the maestro's best works. But it functions with masterful ambient precision for the occasion and is, at the very least, another reminder of Williams' immense technical superiority."

== Accolades ==
| Award | Date of ceremony | Category | Recipient(s) | Result | Ref(s) |
|---|---|---|---|---|---|
| Satellite Awards | February 19, 2017 | Best Original Score | John Williams | Nominated | |
| Saturn Awards | June 28, 2017 | Best Music | John Williams | Nominated | |
| World Soundtrack Awards | October 20, 2016 | Film Composer of the Year | John Williams (also for Star Wars: The Force Awakens) | Nominated | |

== Personnel ==
Credits adapted from CD liner notes

- All music composed, orchestrated and conducted by – John Williams
- Recording and mixing – Shawn Murphy
- Editing – Ramiro Belgardt
- Mastering – Patricia Sullivan
- Music contractor – Sandy DeCrescent
- Music preparation – Jo Ann Kane Music Service
- Scoring crew – Adam Michalak, David Marquette, Greg Dennen, Greg Loskorn, Robert Wolff
- Design – Steve Sterling
- Liner Notes – Steven Spielberg
- Executive in charge of music – Mitchell Leib
- Music Librarian – Mark Graham

Instruments

- Bass – Chris Kollgaard, Drew Dembowski, Edward Meares, Michael Valerio, Oscar Hidalgo, Steve Dress, Nico Abondolo
- Bassoon – Damian Montano, Judith Farmer, Rose Corrigan, Samantha Duckworth, Ken Munday
- Cello – Armen Ksajikian, Cecilia Tsan, Dane Little, Dennis Karmazyn, Erika Duke-Kirkpatrick, George Kim Scholes, Jacob Braun, John Walz, László Mezö, Stan Sharp, Timothy Landauer, Stephen Erdody
- Clarinet – Gary Bovyer, Juan Gallegos, Ralph Williams, Stuart Clark, Don Foster
- Flute – Benjamin Smolen, Geri Rotella, Jennifer Olson, Heather Clark
- Harp – Allison Allport, JoAnn Turovsky, Marcia Dickstein
- Horn – Daniel Kelley, David Everson, Dylan Hart, Jenny Kim, Mark Adams, Steve Becknell, Teag Reaves, Andrew Bain
- Keyboards – Alan Steinberger, Gloria Cheng, Michael Lang, Randy Kerber
- Oboe – Lara Wickes, Lelie Resnick, Leslie Reed, Jessica Pearlman
- Percussion – Alan Estes, Ted Atkatz, Greg Goodall, Jerry Williams, Judy Chilnick, Peter Limonick, Steven Schaeffer, Wade Culbreath
- Soloist – Heather Clark
- Trombone – Alex Iles, Bill Reichenbach, Phil Keen, Bill Booth
- Trumpet – Barry Perkins, Daniel Rosenboom, David Washburn, Robert Schaer, Jon Lewis
- Tuba – Don Williams, Doug Tornquist, Jim Self
- Viola – Alma Fernandez, Carolyn Riley, Darrin McCann, David Walther, Erik Rynearson, Lauren Chipman, Luke Maurer, Marlow Fisher, Matthew Funes, Meredith Crawford, Michael Nowak, Robert Brophy, Shawn Mann, Thomas Diener, Victoria Miskolczy, Brian Dembow
- Violin – Alyssa Park, Amy Hershberger, Ana Landauer, Bruce Dukov, Charlie Bisharat, Darius Campo, Elizabeth Hedman, Eric Arvinder, Eun-Mee Ahn, Grace Oh, Helen Nightengale, Irina Voloshina, Jacqueline Brand, Jessica Guideri, Joel Pargman, Katie Sloan, Katia Popov, Kevin Connolly, Kevin Kumar, Lisa Liu, Lisa Sutton, Lorand Lokuszta, Lorenz Gamma, Maia Jasper, Marc Sazer, Natalie Leggett, Nina Evtuhov, Phillip Levy, Radu Pieptea, Rafael Rishik, Roberto Cani, Sara Parkins, Sarah Thornblade, Serena McKinney, Shalini Vijayan, Hatwan Tamara, Tereza Stanislav, Julie Gigante, Roger Wilkie
