= Andor: Season 2 (soundtrack) =

Andor: Season 2 (Original Score)

Soundtrack album by Brandon Roberts and Nicholas Britell
- Released: April 25, 2025 (Vol. 1); May 2, 2025 (Vol. 2); May 9, 2025 (Vol. 3); May 16, 2025 (Vol. 4)
- Genres: Electronic; electro-industrial; experimental; synth-pop; jazz; orchestral
- Length: 45:19 (Vol. 1); 44:27 (Vol. 2); 01:03:56 (Vol. 3); 40:09 (Vol. 4)
- Label: Walt Disney

Nicholas Britell chronology
Succession: Season 3 (2022)	Andor (2025)

Andor: Season 2 (Original Score) is the score album composed by Brandon Roberts and Nicholas Britell for the second season of the American science fiction political spy thriller drama television series Andor.

Towards the end of the season, the music becomes more orchestral to better transition into Michael Giacchino's score for Rogue One, to which Andor serves as a prequel.

Like its predecessor, the soundtrack was released in multiple volumes. Volume 1 was released on April 25, 2025; Volume 2 on May 2; Volume 3 on May 9; and Volume 4 on May 16.

== Track listing ==
All music is composed by Brandon Roberts and Nicholas Britell.

Andor: Season 2 – Vol. 1 (Episodes 1–3) (Original Score)
No.	Title	Length
1.	"Andor (Main Title Theme)"	0:53
2.	"Sinear Avenger"	2:09
3.	"Canyon Run"	2:16
4.	"Remember Me?"	1:23
5.	"The Wedding Begins"	1:30
6.	"Mina-Rau"	2:02
7.	"There's Nothing Out Here!"	2:41
8.	"Jungle Escalation"	1:23
9.	"The Challenge"	1:55
10.	"Five Hands"	3:39
11.	"He's Getting Away!"	1:34
12.	"The Veil & the Braid"	3:00
13.	"Host & Hostess"	1:12
14.	"Inversely Propotional"	1:47
15.	"Tay Is Leaving Early"	1:27
16.	"Where's Wilmon?"	2:07
17.	"Mina Run"	2:42
18.	"Harvest Avenger"	2:23
19.	"Brasso"	2:58
20.	"Andor Onward"	2:13
Total length:		45:19

All music is composed by Brandon Roberts and Nicholas Britell.

Andor: Season 2 – Vol. 2 (Episodes 4–6) (Original Score)
No.	Title	Length
1.	"Andor (Main Title Theme) – Episode 4"	0:41
2.	"The Ghorman Walz"	2:47
3.	"Our Man In Palmo"	1:29
4.	"Safe House Dinner"	2:04
5.	"Mon-Tage"	2:29
6.	"Palmo Town Hall"	3:19
7.	"Saw Gerrera"	4:00
8.	"Andor (Main Title Theme) – Episode 4"	1:23
9.	"Ghorman Intel"	1:07
10.	"Spider for Mom"	1:03
11.	"I Was There"	1:54
12.	"Valkyrian Skye"	1:34
13.	"Turn Out the Lights"	0:42
14.	"Kafhaus Number 1"	2:55
15.	"House of Rylanz"	2:00
16.	"Palmo Recon"	2:07
17.	"Mina Run"	1:12
18.	"Let It Run Wild"	2:04
19.	"Andor (Main Title Theme) – Episode 6"	0:40
20.	"Kafhaus Reunion"	2:21
21.	"Oathkeeper"	2:21
22.	"Sculdun Tower"	1:44
23.	"Crates in Motion"	2:44
24.	"Doctor Heal Thyself"	2:44
25.	"The Bix is Back"	1:42
Total length:		44:27

Andor: Season 2 – Vol. 3 (Episodes 7–9) (Original Score)
No.	Title	Length
1.	"Andor (Main Title Theme) – Episode 7"	0:42
2.	"Yavin"	1:29
3.	"We Are the Ghor"	1:05
4.	"The Force Healer"	2:15
5.	"Messenger"	1:51
6.	"He'll Be There When You Need Him"	2:33
7.	"Sniper"	2:33
8.	"I Knew - Ghorman Aria"	2:11
9.	"Andor (Main Title Theme) – Episode 8"	0:48
10.	"The Plaza Falls"	4:04
11.	"The Galaxy Is Watching"	3:32
12.	"Good Luck Dedra"	1:22
13.	"Fire At Will"	4:03
14.	"Put Them Out There"	2:45
15.	"Who Are You?"	1:26
16.	"Palmo One"	4:47
17.	"We Are the Ghor (Planetary Anthem: Orchesral Version)"	2:29
18.	"Elegy for Ghorman"	3:36
19.	"We Are the Ghor (Planetary Anthem: Acapella Version)"	1:41
20.	"Andor (Main Title Theme) – Episode 9"	0:43
21.	"Bug"	1:47
22.	"Next Year, in Yavin"	1:08
23.	"Article 17-252"	3:50
24.	"I Have Friends Everywhere"	2:07
25.	"Welcome to the Rebellion"	3:32
26.	"Bix's Message"	3:01
27.	"Senate Escape Suite"	2:22
Total length:		01:03:56

Andor: Season 2 – Vol. 4 (Episodes 10–12) (Original Score)
No.	Title	Length
1.	"Andor (Main Title Theme) – Episode 10"	0:43
2.	"A Weapon"	2:51
3.	"What Have You Done?"	1:39
4.	"Nurse Kleya"	1:51
5.	"You're Finished"	1:36
6.	"We've Made Our Choice"	1:37
7.	"Luthen..."	2:23
8.	"Andor (Main Title Theme) – Episode 11"	0:48
9.	"It's Only Her"	2:14
10.	"Safe House Fractal"	0:53
11.	"Mayday!"	1:47
12.	"Tactical Location"	3:51
13.	"I'm Not Leaving You Here"	4:13
14.	"Safe House Showdown"	1:58
15.	"Hard Right Coming"	0:50
16.	"Escort to Yavin"	2:37
17.	"He Made It Worth It"	0:56
18.	"Past/Present/Future"	3:54
19.	"The Throne Room and End Title"	1:43
Total length:		40:09

== Reception ==
"NIAMOS! (Chandrilian Club Mix)", an EDM remix of "Niamos!", which played during the season's third episode, was widely acclaimed. Vanity Fair described it as the 2025 "Song of Summer". Andor's showrunner Tony Gilroy described "Niamos!" as a "galactic hit", with various versions played throughout both seasons.
