= Lincoln (soundtrack) =

Lincoln (Original Motion Picture Soundtrack)

Film score by John Williams
- Released: November 2, 2012
- Recorded: 2012
- Studios: Symphony Center, Chicago
- Genre: Soundtrack
- Length: 58:46
- Label: Sony Classical
- Producer: John Williams

John Williams chronology
War Horse (2011)	Lincoln (2012)	The Book Thief (2013)

Lincoln (Original Motion Picture Soundtrack) is the score album to the 2012 biographical historical drama film Lincoln, based on the Doris Kearns Goodwin's 2005 biography Team of Rivals: The Political Genius of Abraham Lincoln, a semi-biographical novel that covers the final four months of United States President Abraham Lincoln's life. The film is directed by Steven Spielberg, from a screenplay written by Tony Kushner and featured musical score composed and conducted by John Williams, Spielberg's frequent collaborator. The orchestral score was recorded at Symphony Center, Chicago by the Chicago Symphony Orchestra and the Chicago Symphony Chorus. It was released by Sony Classical on November 2, 2012.

The score received critical acclaim, with praise being directed on Williams' composition and orchestration. It was nominated for Original Score at several award ceremonies including Academy Awards, Golden Globe Awards, British Academy Film Awards, Satellite Awards and Grammy Awards. It won the Critics' Choice Movie Award for Best Score, and International Film Music Critics Association Award for Best Original Score for a Drama Film.

== Track listing ==
The track list of Lincoln's score was unveiled on August 24, 2012. The revelation of the track titles, according to IndieWire and CinemaBlend were considered as "mild spoilers" to the film's storyline, which also calling it as suitably important and historical in a grand manner. All music was composed by Williams, except "Battle Cry of Freedom" which was written in 1862 by American composer George Frederick Root (1820–1895) during the American Civil War.

Lincoln (Original Motion Picture Soundtrack)
No.	Title	Length
1.	"The People's House"	3:43
2.	"The Purpose of the Amendment"	3:07
3.	"Getting Out the Vote"	2:49
4.	"The American Process"	3:57
5.	"The Blue and Grey"	3:00
6.	"With Malice Toward None"	1:51
7.	"Call to Muster, and Battle Cry of Freedom"	2:17
8.	"The Southern Delegation, and the Dream"	4:43
9.	"Father and Son"	1:42
10.	"The Race to the House"	2:42
11.	"Equality under the Law"	3:12
12.	"Freedom's Call"	6:08
13.	"Elegy"	2:35
14.	"Remembering Willie"	1:51
15.	"Appomattox, April 9, 1865"	2:38
16.	"The Peterson House, and Finale"	11:00
17.	"With Malice Toward None (Piano Solo)"	1:31
Total length:		58:46

A For Your Consideration promotional album was released prior to the film's soundtrack release, in order to be shortlisted for nominations at major award ceremonies.

For Your Consideration track list
No.	Title	Length
1.	"Quickstep And The American Process"
2.	"Sleeping Tad"
3.	"With Malice Toward None"
4.	"Getting Out the Vote"
5.	"The Southern Delegation Arrives"
6.	"Remembering Willie"
7.	"Message From Grant and Decisions"
8.	"No Sixteen Year Olds Left"
9.	"The Telegraph Office"
10.	"The Purpose of the Amendment"
11.	"Equality Under the Law"
12.	"Welcome to This House"
13.	"The American Process"
14.	"Lincoln Responds To Southern VP"
15.	"City Point"
16.	"Lincoln And Grant / Lee's Departure"
17.	"Trumpet Hymn"
18.	"Now He Belongs to the Ages"
19.	"End Credits"

== Reception ==
The soundtrack received exceptionally positive critical response, praising John Williams' composition and orchestration. From the Texas Public Radio, Nathan Cone stated "Lincoln is hands-down, pleasing music, stately, elegant, with just a hint of the country charm that remained within [Abraham] Lincoln himself, as masterfully played by Daniel Day-Lewis in the film". James Southall of Movie Wave wrote that the score of Lincoln as "exceptional" and "might be strong contender for major award ceremonies". Calling it as "one of the standout works, so far in 2012", Jonathan Broxton of Movie Music addressed the score as "a proud and respectful musical tribute to a true American hero". Hypable called the score as "masterful and memorable". MFiles.com wrote "Lincoln is a score that once again proves no composer can pierce to the emotional heart of a movie with as much tact and grace as John Williams. His music is never just noise for the sake of it, is never dominated by ego or aimless padding. Instead, he always serves the emotional needs of the movie through good, old-fashioned orchestral magic, and it's always a treat to behold. Although the music is for the most part fairly quiet, the building blocks are more easily identifiable than they have been in many Williams scores of late, making it a pleasurable and well-constructed listening experience. And let's not forget Spielberg's part in this enduring collaboration. As director, he shows real sensitivity and understanding in how to deploy music, helping to draw out the very best from Williams. The score works brilliantly on album and yet its largely unobtrusive presence in the film also needs to be commended, quietly urging the drama along and never getting in the way." Filmtracks.com stated "There is extraordinary, carefully crafted finesse to this material that, while perhaps tired and repetitive in Williams' own body of incredible achievements, remains remarkable to behold in the 2010's [sic]." CinemaBlend and Collider ranked it as "one of the best scores from Williams' and Spielberg's collaboration".

== Release history ==
Region	Date	Format(s)	Catalog code	Ref.
United States	November 30, 2012	CD	88725446852	
United States	January 11, 2013	Vinyl	88725446852	
United Kingdom	December 7, 2012	CD	88725446852	
Australia	November 28, 2012	CD	88725446852	
Brazil	December 31, 2012	CD	88725446852	
Japan	April 3, 2013	CD	SICP 3786	

== Accolades ==
Award	Date of ceremony	Category	Recipients and nominees	Result
Academy Awards	February 24, 2013	Best Original Score	John Williams	Nominated
British Academy Film Awards	February 10, 2013	Best Original Music	John Williams	Nominated
Critics' Choice Awards	January 10, 2013	Best Score	John Williams	Won
Golden Globe Awards	January 13, 2013	Best Original Score	John Williams	Nominated
Grammy Awards	January 26, 2014	Best Score Soundtrack for Visual Media	John Williams	Nominated
Houston Film Critics Awards	January 6, 2012	Best Score	John Williams	Nominated
International Film Music Critics Association Awards	February 21, 2013	Film Score of the Year	John Williams	Nominated
International Film Music Critics Association Awards	February 21, 2013	Film Composer of the Year	John Williams	Nominated
International Film Music Critics Association Awards	February 21, 2013	Best Original Score for a Drama Film	John Williams	Won
International Film Music Critics Association Awards	February 21, 2013	Film Music Composition of the Year	John Williams	Nominated
Satellite Awards	December 16, 2012	Best Original Score	John Williams	Nominated
Washington D.C. Area Film Critics Association Awards	December 10, 2012	Best Score	John Williams	Nominated
