= The Post (soundtrack) =

The Post (Original Motion Picture Soundtrack)

Film score by John Williams
- Released: December 22, 2017
- Recorded: 2017
- Studio: Newman Scoring Stage, 20th Century Fox Studios, Los Angeles
- Genre: Film score
- Length: 40:10
- Label: Sony Classical
- Producer: John Williams

John Williams chronology
Star Wars: The Last Jedi (2017)	The Post (2017)	Star Wars: The Rise of Skywalker (2019)

The Post (Original Motion Picture Soundtrack) is the score album to the 2017 film of the same name, directed by Steven Spielberg. The film's musical score is composed by Spielberg's regular collaborator John Williams, in his twenty-eighth collaboration with the director, and is a combination of traditional instrumentation and orchestration. The album was released digitally by Sony Classical Records on December 22, 2017, and was released in CDs on January 12, 2018, coinciding with the film's limited and wide theatrical release in the United States. The album received positive reviews and earned several nominations at award ceremonies, including Critics' Choice Movie Award and Golden Globe Award for "Best Original Score".

== Production ==
Before composing for The Post, John Williams was initially attached to write music for Spielberg's Ready Player One. Since both films had similar post-production schedules, Williams stepped out on scoring the film, in favor of The Post, which later went to Alan Silvestri. He called the score as a combination of traditional orchestration and instrumentation, and Williams opined that the score has "very light, computerised electronic effects". Spielberg has said that The Post was a rare instance in which he went to the recording sessions "having not heard a note" in advance. Recording began on October 30, 2017, in Newman Scoring Stage at the 20th Century Fox Studios, Los Angeles and completed by early-December, few weeks ahead of the film's release.

== Reception ==
Jonathan Broxton wrote "The Post is a nice change of pace for John Williams, who hasn't really embraced this style of more subdued scoring for quite some time; everyone is so enamored with Star Wars and Indiana Jones that his more subtle, less ostentatious works often get overlooked, which is a shame because we need to be reminded just how good he is at them. It's an important score for a prescient film, filled with intelligently rendered music that accurately keeps to the time period while allowing the talky subject matter to develop real dramatic impetus. If any Williams score is recognized by awards bodies in 2017 it's likely to be this one." Filmtracks.com wrote "The Post is more a functional piece of the puzzle than a work of art, Williams succeeding without making much of a statement on his own. It is certainly mundane compared to his other output of 2017, but that was the point of his approach. The album is brief and sadly out of film order, a reassuring but largely unremarkable and redundant listening experience."

James Southall of Movie Wave wrote "John Williams has nothing left to prove – he's been a master at what he does for far longer than I've been alive. But like many of his fans, I've longed for him to have the chance to do a film or two where he gets to show another side – and The Post is one of them [...] while the lack of a strong main theme is not unprecedented in the Williams/Spielberg roster, it is exceptionally unusual – in Minority Report and War of the Worlds there was plenty else going on to make up for it, but not really in The Post. For sure, at least half the album is very enjoyable – and at its best it's excellent – just don't go in expecting too much." Set the Tape's Sean Wilson wrote "over its short length (a mere 40 minutes), Williams packs in the sort of dramatic intuition and instrumental variation that we've come to expect from a soundtrack composer of his towering standing. It's a score that aims not for sentimentality but a purposeful, subtle sense of objectivity, a welcome reminder that his tonal palette (often including those scores written for Spielberg) is more varied than many would like to admit."

David J. Moore of The Movie Elite wrote "Williams' finely tuned minimalist score for The Post (his 28th collaboration with Spielberg) certainly has his signature high-end thematic material, but it also has supremely nuanced and carefully calculated returns for some of the weightier moments in the film. There are points of high tension and dramatic accents in his relatively short score, but there are also some quiet touching moments of classic jazz fusion there as well. Period appropriate and cleanly beautiful, Williams' music is yet another late-career gem."

== Accolades ==
Award	Date of ceremony	Category	Nominee(s)	Result	Ref.
Critics' Choice Movie Awards	January 11, 2018	Best Score	John Williams	Nominated	
Georgia Film Critics Association	January 12, 2018	Best Original Score	John Williams	Nominated	
Golden Globe Awards	January 7, 2018	Best Original Score	John Williams	Nominated	
Houston Film Critics Society	January 6, 2018	Best Score	John Williams	Nominated	
St. Louis Film Critics Association	December 17, 2017	Best Original Score	John Williams	Nominated	

== Track listing ==
No.	Title	Length
1.	"The Papers"	3:56
2.	"The Presses Roll"	5:01
3.	"Nixon's Order"	1:47
4.	"The Oak Room, 1971"	1:46
5.	"Setting the Type"	2:34
6.	"Mother and Daughter"	3:23
7.	"Scanning the Papers"	2:23
8.	"Two Martini Lunch"	2:34
9.	"Deciding to Publish"	5:42
10.	"The Court's Decision and End Credits"	11:04
Total length:		40:10
