= Star Wars: The Rise of Skywalker (soundtrack) =

2019 film score by John Williams

Star Wars: The Rise of Skywalker – Original Motion Picture Soundtrack

Film score by John Williams
- Released: December 18, 2019 (digital); December 20, 2019 (physical)
- Recorded: July–November 18, 2019
- Studio: Sony
- Genre: Soundtrack
- Length: 76:33
- Label: Walt Disney
- Producer: John Williams

John Williams chronology
The Post (2017)	Star Wars: The Rise of Skywalker – Original Motion Picture Soundtrack (2019)	The Fabelmans (2022)

Star Wars: The Rise of Skywalker – Original Motion Picture Soundtrack is the film score to the 2019 film of the same name composed and conducted by John Williams and performed by the Hollywood Studio Symphony. The soundtrack album was released in both digital formats and digipak CD by Walt Disney Records on December 18 and 20, 2019 respectively. It is his final soundtrack for the franchise; shortly before the sessions began, Williams announced that he would be retiring from Star Wars after over 40 years as its primary music composer. The score earned an Academy Award nomination for Best Original Score and won Williams a Saturn Award for Best Music.

== Overview ==
On January 10, 2018, it was confirmed that John Williams would return to compose and conduct The Rise of Skywalker. The next month, Williams announced that it would be the last Star Wars film for which he would compose the score. In August 2019, at Tanglewood's Film Night, Williams revealed that scoring sessions were underway and that 80% of the music for Episode IX had been recorded and that an additional 40 minutes would be recorded at the request of director J. J. Abrams.

Recording of the score had begun in mid-July at Sony Pictures Studios' Barbra Streisand Scoring Stage in Culver City, but ended up requiring as many as 11 sessions scattered over a five-month period. Williams conducted the sessions himself, recording over three hours of music which consisted of new material and revisions of previous themes. Speaking about the recording process, he said that "It was a wonderful way to spend six or eight months...and for being grateful for having the energy and interest to work with the orchestra, which was very lovely." William Ross assisted with orchestrations, while mixing was handled by sound engineer Shawn Murphy. Like the previous sequel trilogy films, it was recorded with a 102-piece ensemble of the Hollywood Studio Symphony together with a 100-voice Los Angeles Master Chorale. The final day of recording occurred on November 18, 2019, with many of the cast and executives present, such as Star Wars actors Mark Hamill, Daisy Ridley, Kelly Marie Tran and frequent collaborator Steven Spielberg.

In a lead up to the release of the soundtrack, a For Your Consideration soundtrack album was released on the Disney awards website on December 10, 2019, which consisted of 50 minutes of the music for the film. However, due to reasons unknown, it was taken down shortly after.

== Track listing ==
All music is composed by John Williams.

No.	Title	Length
1.	"Fanfare and Prologue"	4:34
2.	"Journey to Exegol"	2:49
3.	"The Rise of Skywalker"	4:18
4.	"The Old Death Star"	3:16
5.	"The Speeder Chase"	3:21
6.	"Destiny of a Jedi"	5:12
7.	"Anthem of Evil"	3:23
8.	"Fleeing from Kijimi"	2:51
9.	"We Go Together"	3:17
10.	"Join Me"	3:42
11.	"They Will Come"	2:50
12.	"The Final Saber Duel"	3:57
13.	"Battle of the Resistance"	2:51
14.	"Approaching the Throne"	4:16
15.	"The Force Is with You"	3:59
16.	"Farewell"	5:14
17.	"Reunion"	4:05
18.	"A New Home"	1:47
19.	"Finale"	10:51
Total length:		1:16:33

== Additional music ==
Title	Musician(s)	Key scenes/Notes
"Lido Hey"	Lin-Manuel Miranda, J. J. Abrams	Performed by Shag Kava, a musical moniker for Miranda and Abrams. Plays as the main characters participate and traverse the Festival of the Ancestors on the desert planet Pasaana.
"Oma's Place"	Ricky Tinez, J. J. Abrams	Performed by Ricky Tinez and J. J. Abrams. Plays as the main characters enter a bar owned by Oma Tres (featuring composer John Williams in a cameo role) on the planet Kijimi.

== Charts ==
Chart (2019–2020)	Peak position
Australian Albums (ARIA)	25
Belgian Albums (Ultratop Flanders)	52
Belgian Albums (Ultratop Wallonia)	89
German Albums (Offizielle Top 100)	35
Hungarian Albums (MAHASZ)	25
Japanese Albums (Oricon)	28
Scottish Albums (Official Charts)	53
Spanish Albums (PROMUSICAE)	28
Swiss Albums (Schweizer Hitparade)	43
UK Albums (Official Charts)	57
UK Soundtrack Albums (Official Charts)	5
US Billboard 200	42

== Awards ==
On February 20, 2020, John Williams won 3 IFMCA Awards for the score, including Score of the Year, Best Original Score for a Fantasy/Sci-Fi/Fantasy Film, and Film Score Composition of the Year for the film's main theme, The Rise of Skywalker. Williams was also nominated for the Academy Award for Best Original Score. Williams also won the Saturn Award for Best Music for his work on the film at the 46th Saturn Awards.
