= Star Wars: The Last Jedi (soundtrack) =

Star Wars: The Last Jedi – Original Motion Picture Soundtrack

Film score by John Williams
- Released: December 15, 2017
- Recorded: December 13, 2016–June 2017
- Studio: Sony Pictures Studios
- Genre: Soundtrack
- Length: 77:31
- Label: Walt Disney
- Producer: John Williams

John Williams chronology
The BFG (2016)	Star Wars: The Last Jedi – Original Motion Picture Soundtrack (2017)	The Post (2017)

Star Wars: The Last Jedi – Original Motion Picture Soundtrack is the film score to the 2017 film of the same name composed and conducted by John Williams and performed by the Hollywood Studio Symphony. The album was released by Walt Disney Records on December 15, 2017, in digipak CD, Jewel case CD, digital formats, and streaming services.

The score received generally positive reviews from critics, who primarily praised the score's emotional sound and expansion of themes from the Original Trilogy and The Force Awakens, though some criticized the score for relying too heavily on older themes, especially on the soundtrack album. Williams was nominated for an Oscar, Grammy, and a Saturn Award for his work on the score.

== Overview ==
In July 2013, Kathleen Kennedy announced at Star Wars Celebration Europe that John Williams would return to score the Star Wars sequel trilogy. Williams confirmed his assignment for The Last Jedi at a Tanglewood concert in August 2016, stating he would begin recording the score "off and on" in December 2016 until March or April 2017. On February 21, 2017, it was confirmed that recording was underway, with both Williams and William Ross conducting the sessions. In lieu of a traditional spotting session with director Rian Johnson, Williams was provided a temp track of music from his previous film scores as a reference for scoring The Last Jedi.

== Track listing ==
The score introduces several new themes interwoven throughout the film, including identities for the character Rose Tico, the interactions between Rey and Luke Skywalker on Ahch-To Island, and the Resistance's desperate escape from the First Order.

The score also reprises numerous themes and motifs introduced in The Force Awakens, including those for the characters of Rey, Kylo Ren, Poe Dameron, and Snoke, as well as the "March of the Resistance". Themes introduced in the original trilogy return as well, including "Luke's Theme", "Leia's Theme", "The Rebel Fanfare", the "Force Theme" and a small quote of the "Death Star motif" from A New Hope; "Yoda's Theme", "The Imperial March", and "Han Solo and the Princess" from The Empire Strikes Back; and, "Luke and Leia" and "The Emperor's Theme" from Return of the Jedi, and the Star Wars prequels. Excerpts of the "TIE Fighter Attack" cue, first heard in A New Hope and reprised for Return of the Jedi, are also included. "The Emperor's Theme" is the only returning theme to not be included within the official soundtrack presentation (it was later made accessible through the digital "music only" version of the film); it occurs in the film when Snoke tortures Rey for information.

The score briefly quotes "Aquarela do Brasil" by Ary Barroso in its "Canto Bight" track as a reference to the 1985 Terry Gilliam film Brazil. It also contains a brief quote of Williams's own theme for The Long Goodbye (co-composed by Johnny Mercer) during Finn and Rose's escape, although this was not included in the official soundtrack release.

On March 13, the digital release of The Last Jedi came with an exclusive "music only" version of the film, which features the film's complete score without any dialogue or sound effects to interfere. The complete score contains the music from every single scene of the film, and features over 70 minutes of previously unreleased music. However, the film's presentation of the score is heavily edited and does not always reflect the original form of Williams' compositions.

All tracks are written by John Williams.

No.	Title	Length
1.	"Main Title and Escape"	7:25
2.	"Ahch-To Island"	4:22
3.	"Revisiting Snoke"	3:28
4.	"The Supremacy"	4:00
5.	"Fun with Finn and Rose"	2:33
6.	"Old Friends"	4:28
7.	"The Rebellion Is Reborn"	3:59
8.	"Lesson One"	2:09
9.	"Canto Bight" (Includes excerpt of "Aquarela do Brasil" by Ary Barroso)	2:37
10.	"Who Are You?"	3:04
11.	"The Fathiers"	2:42
12.	"The Cave"	2:59
13.	"The Sacred Jedi Texts"	3:32
14.	"A New Alliance"	3:13
15.	"Chrome Dome"	2:01
16.	"The Battle of Crait"	6:47
17.	"The Spark"	3:35
18.	"The Last Jedi"	3:03
19.	"Peace and Purpose"	3:06
20.	"Finale"	8:28
Total length:		77:31

== Charts ==
Chart (2017–18)	Peak position
Australian Albums (ARIA)	54
Austrian Albums (Ö3 Austria)	52
Belgian Albums (Ultratop Flanders)	37
Belgian Albums (Ultratop Wallonia)	72
Canadian Albums (Billboard)	22
Dutch Albums (Album Top 100)	44
German Albums (Offizielle Top 100)	33
Hungarian Albums (MAHASZ)	31
New Zealand Heatseeker Albums (RMNZ)	4
Scottish Albums (Official Charts)	41
Spanish Albums (PROMUSICAE)	19
Swiss Albums (Schweizer Hitparade)	39
UK Albums (Official Charts)	39
US Billboard 200	12
