= Star Wars: The Force Awakens (soundtrack) =

Star Wars: The Force Awakens – Original Motion Picture Soundtrack

Film score by John Williams
- Released: December 18, 2015
- Recorded: June 1 – November 14, 2015
- Studio: Sony Pictures Studios
- Genre: Soundtrack
- Length: 1:17:08
- Label: Walt Disney
- Producer: John Williams

John Williams chronology
The Book Thief (2013)	Star Wars: The Force Awakens – Original Motion Picture Soundtrack (2015)	The BFG (2016)

Star Wars: The Force Awakens – Original Motion Picture Soundtrack is the film score to the 2015 film of the same name composed by John Williams with Williams and William Ross conducting, and Gustavo Dudamel appearing as a "special guest conductor". The album was released by Walt Disney Records on December 18, 2015, in both digipak CD and digital formats.

The score received critical acclaim, receiving praise for its new themes and use of old ones. The main theme, "Rey's Theme", was the subject of mass acclaim, with the track reaching 10 million views on YouTube. For the score, John Williams received his 50th Oscar nomination, being nominated for the Academy Award for Best Original Score, his first nomination for a Star Wars film since Return of the Jedi. Williams won the Saturn Award for Best Music, his first win since Revenge of the Sith. Williams also won the Grammy Award for Best Score Soundtrack for Visual Media for the score, making it his 11th win in the category.

== Overview ==
In July 2013, John Williams was confirmed to return to compose the sequel trilogy, beginning with The Force Awakens. The music from the first two trailers for the film was reworked from earlier compositions. Williams began working on the score in December 2014 and by June 2015, he had been through most of the film reels, working on a daily basis. In May 2015, Williams said he would reuse themes from the previous films, such as those for Luke, Leia and Han, in ways that "will seem very natural and right in the moments for which we've chosen to do these kinds of quotes. There aren't many of them, but there are a few that I think are important and will seem very much a part of the fabric of the piece in a positive and constructive way." He said that working with J. J. Abrams was similar to the process he went through with George Lucas in the earlier films.

Recording sessions for The Force Awakens began on June 1, 2015, at the Sony Pictures Studios' Barbra Streisand Scoring Stage in Culver City, with William Ross conducting most of the music. Williams attended the sessions and conducted the remainder of the recordings. He called the recording process “very luxurious,” with 12 sessions scattered over a five-month period between June and November. The score was recorded by a freelance orchestra—making it the first live-action Star Wars soundtrack not to feature the London Symphony Orchestra—with sessions continuing on and off over that five-month period. The 85-piece orchestra recorded 175 minutes of music, although nearly an hour of that was discarded, modified, or rerecorded as Abrams re-edited the film. The theme for Snoke was recorded by a 24-voice men's chorus. Gustavo Dudamel conducted the opening and end title music for the film at Williams' behest. The last recording session took place on November 14, 2015.

Leading up to the release of The Force Awakens multiple music streaming services began offering users Star Wars-themed playlists. "Streaming platforms didn't exist for the [previous] movies, so that's something that we'll be rolling out, along with character-driven playlists with sounds and dialogue from the movie," said Ken Bunt, president of the Disney Music Group. "People love to hear dialogue and sound effects, so we're working on some ideas now that will incorporate some of that into playlisting." Upon its release, the soundtrack for The Force Awakens became available to stream via Spotify.

== Reception ==
Professional ratings
Review scores
Source	Rating
AllMusic	4/5 stars
Filmtracks.com	5/5 stars
Movie Wave	5/5 stars
The National	4/4 stars
Soundtrack Dreams	94/100
Soundtrack Geek	96.5/100

The musical score has received critical acclaim. James Southall of Movie Wave said, "The new themes are great, hearing the old ones again is wonderful, the action music is remarkably energetic and the musical storytelling as vibrant as ever. It's just so good hearing Williams return to this universe." Jørn Tillnes of Soundtrack Geek said, "The fact is that this score is not even close to the classic trilogy and it struggles with the prequel trilogy as well. I don't know if it's the weakest in the saga. Time will tell. What I do know is that it's one of the best scores I've heard in a while." uDiscover gave the score a positive review, saying, "The expansive, dramatic passages are as full-bodied as one would hope for a film as epic as The Force Awakens, but the attention to detail within the score – and the exquisitely recorded performance – make the results a subtle and engaging listen."

Jonathan Broxton of Movie Music UK praised the score, saying, "Even when you look at it objectively, what John Williams has achieved with this score is nothing short of remarkable. He has written five new themes, two of which – 'Rey's Theme' and the 'March of the Resistance' – are wonderfully memorable, and can stand shoulder-to-shoulder with the already bulging cache of memorable themes within the Star Wars universe."

It was nominated for Best Original Score category at 88th Academy Awards and lost to Ennio Morricone's score for The Hateful Eight.

== Commercial performance ==
The soundtrack debuted at number five on the Billboard 200 chart for the week ending November 26, 2015, with 100,000 album-equivalent units, of which 94,000 were pure album sales. It marked the highest debut for a score-only soundtrack since 1999, when The Phantom Menace placed at number 3. Additionally, it is the sixth Star Wars soundtrack in the main Star Wars film series to reach the top ten; only the Return of the Jedi soundtrack failed to reach top ten, peaking at number 20 in 1983. The album has sold 206,000 copies in the US as of April 2016.

== Track listing ==
All music is composed by John Williams.

No.	Title	Length
1.	"Main Title and The Attack on the Jakku Village"	6:25
2.	"The Scavenger"	3:39
3.	"I Can Fly Anything"	3:10
4.	"Rey Meets BB-8"	1:31
5.	"Follow Me"	2:54
6.	"Rey's Theme"	3:11
7.	"The Falcon"	3:32
8.	"That Girl with the Staff"	1:58
9.	"The Rathtars!"	4:05
10.	"Finn's Confession"	2:08
11.	"Maz's Counsel"	3:07
12.	"The Starkiller"	1:50
13.	"Kylo Ren Arrives at the Battle"	2:00
14.	"The Abduction"	2:23
15.	"Han and Leia"	4:41
16.	"March of the Resistance"	2:34
17.	"Snoke"	2:03
18.	"On the Inside"	2:06
19.	"Torn Apart"	4:19
20.	"The Ways of the Force"	3:14
21.	"Scherzo for X-Wings"	2:32
22.	"Farewell and The Trip"	4:55
23.	"The Jedi Steps and Finale"	8:51
Total length:		1:17:08

== Personnel ==
Credits adopted from Allmusic:

Production

- John Williams – composer, orchestrator, conductor, producer
- William Ross – orchestrator, conductor
- Gustavo Dudamel – special guest conductor
- Sandy DeCrescent – music contractor
- Sally Stevens – vocal contractor

Management

- Mark Graham – music librarian
- Scott Holtzman – legal advisor, music business affairs
- Mitchell Leib – executive in charge of music
- Marc Shaw – legal advisor, music business affairs
- Steve Sterling – package design

Technical

- Ramiro Belgardt – music editor
- Shawn Murphy – score engineer / scoring mixer
- John Traunwieser – score mixing assistant
- Robert Wolff – scoring editor
- Patricia Sullivan – mastering

Orchestration

- Luke Flynn – music preparation
- Mark Graham – head of music preparation
- Paul S. Henning – score preparation/orchestration
- Riley Hughes – music preparation
- Gregory Jamrok – music preparation
- Randy Kerber – musician: keyboards
- Andrew Rowan – music preparation
- Steven L. Smith – music preparation
- Chris Westlake – music consultant
- Joe Zimmerman – music preparation

== Additional music ==
Additional music featured in The Force Awakens:

Title	Musician(s)	Key Scenes/Notes
"Jabba Flow"	Lin-Manuel Miranda, J. J. Abrams	Performed by Shag Kava, a musical moniker for Miranda and Abrams. Plays as the main characters enter Maz Kanata's castle. The song was released as a single on May 4, 2016.
"Dobra Doompa"	Lin-Manuel Miranda, J. J. Abrams	Performed by Shag Kava. Plays after "Jabba Flow" in Kanata's castle.

== Charts ==
=== Weekly charts ===
Chart (2015–16)	Peak position
Australian Albums (ARIA)	24
Austrian Albums (Ö3 Austria)	29
Belgian Albums (Ultratop Flanders)	19
Belgian Albums (Ultratop Wallonia)	46
Canadian Albums (Billboard)	11
Danish Albums (Hitlisten)	40
Dutch Albums (Album Top 100)	26
French Albums (SNEP)	47
Hungarian Albums (MAHASZ)	15
Irish Albums (IRMA)	37
Italian Albums (FIMI)	64
New Zealand Albums (RMNZ)	38
Polish Albums (ZPAV)	19
Spanish Albums (Promusicae)	20
Swedish Albums (Sverigetopplistan)	42
Swiss Albums (Schweizer Hitparade)	27
UK Albums (Official Charts)	25
US Billboard 200	5
US Soundtrack Albums (Billboard)	1

=== Year-end charts ===
Chart (2016)	Position
US Billboard 200	143
US Soundtrack Albums (Billboard)	3

== Certifications ==
Region	Certification	Certified units/sales
United Kingdom (BPI)	Silver	60,000^{‡}
^{‡} Sales+streaming figures based on certification alone.
