= Andor (soundtrack) =

Andor (Original Score)

Soundtrack album by Nicholas Britell
- Released: October 21, 2022 (Vol. 1); November 4, 2022 (Vol. 2); December 9, 2022 (Vol. 3)
- Recorded: 2020–2022
- Studios: Air Studios, London
- Genres: Electronic; electro-industrial; experimental; synth-pop; jazz; orchestral
- Length: 50:34 (Vol. 1); 53:24 (Vol. 2); 55:51 (Vol. 3)
- Label: Walt Disney
- Producer: Nicholas Britell

Nicholas Britell chronology
Succession: Season 3 (2022)	Andor (2022)	She Said (2022)

Singles from Andor (Original Score)
- 1. "Andor (Main Title Themes) – Episodes 1, 2 and 3" Released: September 21, 2022

Andor (Original Score) is the score album composed by Nicholas Britell for the first season of the American science fiction political spy thriller drama television series Andor, the fourth live-action television series in the Star Wars franchise. The score, recorded over two years, is notable for its use of electronic instruments, a departure from the orchestral scores of previous projects in the Star Wars franchise.

The soundtrack was released in three volumes, each containing the music from four episodes of the season. Volume 1 was released on October 21; Volume 2 on November 4; and Volume 3 on December 9. The main title themes from the first three episodes were released as singles, coinciding with the show's premiere on September 21, 2022. A vinyl compilation album was released on July 19, 2024. The score received critical acclaim, with praise for Britell's musical approach.

== Background ==
Series creator Tony Gilroy felt that "music in Star Wars is just absolutely essentially identified with John Williams", and saw the need to use a different musical vocabulary with respect to cast, setting, and music. He contacted Nicholas Britell about composing music for the series before filming began, so he could use source music to play on set. Andor is the first Star Wars project scored by Britell, though he admits to being a huge fan of the franchise, as well as a fan of Gilroy's work.

Gilroy and Britell, along with executive producer Kathleen Kennedy, first met in August 2020. The trio felt it was important for the season to have a unique score, and that it should evolve with the story. Britell has stated that the large scope of the series meant that "every episode has new demands, new music, and new ideas." Britell also said that Gilroy gave him freedom to experiment with the music in order to create a unique musical landscape. Hence, he created a score that is marked by its heavy use of electronic music and analog synthesizers, although orchestral music was still featured in parts.

Recording took place at the Lyndhurst Hall in Air Studios, London, two years before Britell was announced as the series' composer in February 2022. Multiple sessions were held at the venue, and more than 90 players performed in the orchestra. Britell was not present at the venue due to COVID-19 pandemic restrictions, and his team supervised the recording sessions in his place while also managing other television series.

== Composition ==
The title theme exists as multiple versions used in different episodes, which either include synth, cello, or a band performing. Each theme has different orchestrations to fit with the different opening sequences in each episode. In the first three episodes, the music is there to provide a sense of atmosphere. For the planet Kenari's theme, Britell "wanted to create that sense of a lost world and of childhood". To simulate a forest, he used wooden blocks, branches and leaves, as well as sonic creation and string motifs mixed with synthesizer. For the planet Ferrix, the Time Grappler sound was created by banging on metal in Britell's basement.

For one scene featuring Luthen Rael, Britell used an orchestra to give a "rich swelling sound", and for other scenes a felt-piano sound to add to poignant moments. Britell felt these sounds had a "kind of imperfection to them" and that the listener would be able to "feel the physicality" of the sound while watching the episode. Diegetic music was used for scenes on the planet Morlana One, and the theme for the prison planet Narkina 5 has a new soundscape with synths that are "dark, almost subterranean".

The detuned synthesizers are used in the score for the eighth and ninth episodes. In the tenth episode, the prison escape sequence has orchestral music consisting of French horns and celli. In the penultimate episode, a cello nonet of Maarva's theme was played with minimalistic music to describe the silence in the score, as Cassian is "let alone in the world".

The music used during the funeral in the season finale was the first piece written for the series, due to the scene being a climactic point of the season.

== Release ==
The main title themes from the first three episodes were released as singles on September 21, 2022, coinciding with the show's premiere. The soundtrack was released in three volumes, each covering four episodes of the series. The first volume was released on October 21, 2022, the second on November 4, and the third on December 9.

== Track listing ==
All music is composed by Nicholas Britell.

Andor: Vol. 1 (Episodes 1–4)
No.	Title	Length
1.	"Andor (Main Title Theme) – Episode 1"	1:18
2.	"WE BEGIN (Time Grappler)"	0:37
3.	"Niamos! (Morlana Club Mix)"	1:42
4.	"Morlana Drop"	1:45
5.	"Pre-Mor Shakedown"	0:57
6.	"B2"	1:17
7.	"Rix Road"	1:51
8.	"Bix Caleen"	0:50
9.	"Kenari Council"	1:48
10.	"Bix Has a Secret"	1:08
11.	"Kenari Male Wanted for Questioning"	0:59
12.	"The Cassian Way"	1:42
13.	"Andor (Main Title Theme) – Episode 2"	0:52
14.	"End of Day"	1:21
15.	"Who Else Knows?"	1:47
16.	"Luthen Rael"	1:25
17.	"The Kenari War Cry"	1:32
18.	"The Night Before"	1:58
19.	"Pilgrim"	1:29
20.	"Andor (Main Title Theme) – Episode 3"	0:40
21.	"Mirror"	2:08
22.	"Corpos"	1:41
23.	"In Their House/Who Are You?"	2:07
24.	"The Reckoning"	0:56
25.	"Past/Present Suite"	3:44
26.	"Andor (Main Title Theme) – Episode 4"	0:47
27.	"I Came for You"	2:40
28.	"ISB"	0:41
29.	"Blue Kyber"	1:27
30.	"Where's My Starpath Unit?"	1:08
31.	"Luthen of Coruscant"	1:23
32.	"Syril Suite"	1:50
33.	"Mon Mothma"	2:17
34.	"END OF DAY (Time Grappler)"	0:36
Total length:		50:34

Andor: Vol. 2 (Episodes 5–8)
No.	Title	Length
1.	"Andor (Main Title Theme) – Episode 5"	1:08
2.	"If I Was Them"	1:34
3.	"The Valley"	2:10
4.	"Tomorrow"	3:51
5.	"Andor (Main Title Theme) – Episode 6"	0:50
6.	"Get Down!"	2:36
7.	"No Turning Back"	1:13
8.	"The Vault – Parts 1 and 2"	3:45
9.	"The Vault – Parts 3 and 4"	3:11
10.	"The Rono Trawler"	2:05
11.	"Climb!"	2:30
12.	"The Morning After"	1:15
13.	"Andor (Main Title Theme) – Episode 7"	0:58
14.	"Fuel Purity"	1:17
15.	"Kleya"	1:26
16.	"I Thought He'd Be Here"	1:05
17.	"Niamos! (Coruscant Lounge Mix)"	2:27
18.	"Maarva's Rebellion"	2:54
19.	"Niamos! (Galaxy Mix)"	1:08
20.	"Tourists Don't Run"	2:01
21.	"Six Year Sentence"	1:45
22.	"Andor (Main Title Theme) – Episode 8"	0:51
23.	"Move!"	0:48
24.	"Narkina 5"	1:02
25.	"Unit 5-2-D"	4:20
26.	"Thirty Shifts Later"	2:38
27.	"Shut It Down"	2:22
Total length:		53:24

Andor: Vol. 3 (Episodes 9–12)
No.	Title	Length
1.	"Andor (Main Title Theme) – Episode 9"	0:44
2.	"Cousins"	1:25
3.	"Ulaf Fading"	0:54
4.	"Never More Than Twelve"	2:08
5.	"Andor (Main Title Theme) – Episode 10"	1:18
6.	"Make It Look Good"	1:44
7.	"One Way Out – Parts 1-4"	1:20
8.	"One Way Out – Parts 5-7"	1:51
9.	"One Way Out – Part 8"	2:24
10.	"My Name Is Kino Loy"	4:15
11.	"Heroes"	1:08
12.	"Andor (Main Title Theme) – Episode 11"	0:43
13.	"Tell Me They're Leaving/Bee"	1:27
14.	"The Daughters of Ferrix"	1:43
15.	"Dewi and Freedi Pamular"	0:54
16.	"Full Fondor"	1:27
17.	"Your Mother Is Dead"	3:42
18.	"Andor (Main Title Theme) – Episode 12"	0:58
19.	"Dedra in Ferrix"	1:32
20.	"Come Away From the Window"	1:20
21.	"Clem's Stone"	1:55
22.	"Manifesto"	2:13
23.	"Forming Up/Unto Stone We Are"	4:43
24.	"Eulogy"	4:17
25.	"Battle"	1:38
26.	"Cassian Will Find Us"	2:32
27.	"Kill Me"	1:25
28.	"The Rebellion Suite"	4:00
Total length:		55:51

== Chart performance ==
Chart performance for Andor: Vol. 1 (Episodes 1–4) [Original Score]
Chart (2022)	Peak position
UK Soundtrack Albums (OCC)	34

Chart performance for Andor: Vol. 2 (Episodes 5–8) [Original Score]
Chart (2022)	Peak position
UK Soundtrack Albums (OCC)	43

== Compilation album ==
A physical version of the score titled Music from Andor released exclusively on vinyl record on July 19, 2024. The album compiles 18 selected tracks from the three digital volumes.

All music is composed by Nicholas Britell.

Side A
No.	Title	Length
1.	"Andor (Main Title Theme) – Episode 1"	1:18
2.	"Niamos! (Morlana Club Mix)"	1:42
3.	"B2"	1:17
4.	"Luthen Rael"	1:25
5.	"The Night Before"	1:58
6.	"Pilgrim"	1:29
7.	"Mirror"	2:08
8.	"Past/Present Suite"	3:44
9.	"ISB"	0:41
10.	"Mon Mothma"	2:17
11.	"Climb!"	2:30

Side B
No.	Title	Length
1.	"Andor (Main Title Theme) – Episode 10"	1:18
2.	"Thirty Shifts Later"	2:38
3.	"My Name Is Kino Loy"	4:15
4.	"Your Mother Is Dead"	3:42
5.	"Manifesto"	2:13
6.	"Forming Up/Unto Stone We Are"	4:43
7.	"The Rebellion Suite"	4:00
