= Obi-Wan Kenobi (soundtrack) =

Obi-Wan Kenobi (Original Soundtrack)

Film score by Natalie Holt
- Released: June 29, 2022
- Recorded: February–April 2022
- Studios: Newman Scoring Stage, Twentieth Century Studios
- Genre: Soundtrack
- Length: 1:22:34
- Label: Walt Disney
- Producer: Natalie Holt

Natalie Holt chronology
Loki: Season 1 (2021)	Obi-Wan Kenobi (Original Soundtrack) (2022)	Loki: Season 2 (2023)

Singles from Obi-Wan Kenobi
- 1. "Obi-Wan" Released: May 27, 2022

Obi-Wan Kenobi (Original Soundtrack) is the musical score accompanying the 2022 Disney+ limited series Obi-Wan Kenobi, composed by Natalie Holt and William Ross with the main theme for the title character composed by John Williams. It was released by Walt Disney Records on June 29, 2022.

== Background ==
After composing the score for the Disney+ series Loki in 2021, an online petition on Twitter called for Natalie Holt to be hired to compose a Star Wars score. On April 22, 2022, Holt was confirmed to be the composer for Obi-Wan Kenobi. Holt is the first woman to compose the score for a live-action Star Wars project. Holt met with series director Deborah Chow in London where the tone of the series was discussed. Holt was shown an unfinished rough cut of all six episodes in December 2021 before starting work on composing the score.

== Composition ==
Holt said that her composition process was "a more similar journey to John Powell or Michael Giacchino", the respective composers for Solo: A Star Wars Story (2018) and Rogue One: A Star Wars Story (2016), in being "steeped in the historical heritage characters" compared to the musical freedom granted to Ludwig Göransson with the new characters featured in The Mandalorian. Nevertheless, Holt still wanted her approach to feel new while also paying homage to previous Star Wars scores.

In composing the music for the planet of Daiyu, described by Kenobi writer Joby Harold as having a "Hong Kong feel" with "graffiti-ridden nightlife", Holt took influence from different real-world cultural music. She interpolated elements of Latin music and more "Eastern" sounds from Thailand and Hong Kong to represent different planets. For the planet of Alderaan, Holt added "South American flavors" including rhythmic elements and modern synths.

Holt withheld using familiar Star Wars themes by John Williams throughout the series until "Part VI". Williams' "Imperial March" is not heard until Darth Vader has "earned" the theme in becoming "much more measured" at the end of his journey in the series according to Holt. Director Deborah Chow did not want the Imperial March to play every time Vader is on screen. Holt also quotes Williams' "Force Theme" and "Princess Leia's Theme" in her score for the final episode.

== Recording ==
Despite his appearance in A New Hope (1977), Obi-Wan Kenobi was the only major character that John Williams did not write a distinct theme for. John Williams recorded his theme for Obi-Wan in mid-February 2022. Williams composed his new Obi-Wan theme in just two weeks. This was the second time Williams had written a theme for a Star Wars project for which he was not the main composer, following Solo. Holt described William's theme as "reflective" and "just entirely appropriate" for the series. Holt had begun composing her own music before Williams had created and recorded his new Obi-Wan theme. She had created her own Obi-Wan theme before Williams was confirmed to be contributing to the score. She said that her own theme was "weirdly, [...] very similar to his". However, Holt did not directly collaborate with Williams on composing the theme or score and they did not even meet until Star Wars Celebration. Holt credits Williams' music in E.T. (1982) with her noticing film music for the first time so she said it was a "privilege" to work with the "genius" Williams.

To record the score for the series, Holt worked with recording engineer Chris Fogel, who had previously engineered Ludwig Göransson's score for The Mandalorian. Holt's music was recorded with a traditional orchestra of 75 musicians in Los Angeles at the Fox Studios Newman Scoring Stage, with some modern synth sounds added. Holt contributed singing, viola, and violin performances to the score, while concert violinist James Ehnes—who Holt had admiration for and who happened to be in Los Angeles while recording was underway—provided violin solo performances. Holt completed her work on the series' score by late April 2022.

== Release ==
Alongside the debut of the first two episodes of Obi-Wan Kenobi, John Williams' theme "Obi-Wan" was released digitally on May 27, 2022. Williams publicly performed his new Obi-Wan theme for the first time at Star Wars Celebration, a day before the series' premiere. The full soundtrack album was released digitally by Walt Disney Records on June 29, 2022, a week after the final episode was premiered.

== Track listing ==
All music is composed by Natalie Holt, except where noted.

Obi-Wan Kenobi (Original Soundtrack)
No.	Title	Composer(s)	Length
1.	"Obi-Wan"	John Williams	4:06
2.	"Order 66"		1:40
3.	"Inquistors' Hunt"		3:09
4.	"Young Leia"		1:04
5.	"Days of Alderaan"		1:38
6.	"The Journey Begins"	William Ross	2:57
7.	"Bail and Leia"		2:19
8.	"Nari's Shadow"		1:14
9.	"Ready to Go"		2:26
10.	"Daiyu"		2:25
11.	"Cat and Mouse"		3:10
12.	"Spice Den"		1:10
13.	"First Rescue"	William Ross	3:10
14.	"Mapuzo"		1:17
15.	"The Path"		1:35
16.	"Sensing Vader"		2:49
17.	"Parallel Lines"		2:12
18.	"Some Things Can't Be Forgotten"	William Ross	4:47
19.	"Stormtrooper Patrol"		2:34
20.	"Hangar Escape"		2:33
21.	"Hold Hands"		1:39
22.	"Empire Arrival"		2:04
23.	"Dark Side Assault"		2:37
24.	"I Will Do What I Must"	William Ross	2:48
25.	"Sacrifice"		1:41
26.	"No Further Use"		3:39
27.	"Overcoming the Past"	William Ross	4:28
28.	"Tatooine Desert Chase"		2:19
29.	"Who You Become"		3:36
30.	"Saying Goodbye"	William Ross	5:26
31.	"End Credit"	William Ross	4:02
Total length:			1:22:34

== Critical reception ==
The Obi-Wan theme by Williams received praise from critics. Shane Romanchick of Collider said that the theme is "fit for a fallen Jedi Knight" and is "a much more reserved piece that fits our reluctant hero well". Lacy Long of Collider wrote that Holt's score "really brings out the atmosphere, mood, and tone of the series". Zanobard Reviews criticised the score saying "instead of a highly memorable, powerfully Star Wars Kenobi score, we got a fairly dull, meandering one that delivers very few actual highlights." Jonathan Broxton wrote "In context, though, that's a different matter, and I remain baffled by the creative decisions that the director, the producers, and seemingly John Williams himself took to limit the use of the legacy Star Wars themes. In the end it might have been better if they had simply gone fully one way or fully the other – either let Natalie Holt go full Ludwig Göransson and create an entirely new sonic world, or let William Ross score the whole thing using all the John Williams legacy themes in the classic Star Wars style. The hybrid model we have, while absolutely enjoyable as a listening experience, is ultimately damaging to the dramatic narrative development of the actual story, and that's basically unforgivable." Marvelous Geek Media wrote "What Holt does with this soundtrack is so unique that so few words come close to describing the comfort that they evoke. It's the same comfort that we often feel entering a galaxy far, far away—the kind of homecoming that feels right and emotionally rewarding."

== Charts ==
Chart performance for Obi-Wan Kenobi (Original Soundtrack)
Chart (2022)	Peak position
UK Album Downloads (Official Charts)	45
