= Grammy Award for Best Instrumental Composition =

Grammy award

- Awarded for: Quality instrumental compositions
- Country: United States
- Presented by: National Academy of Recording Arts and Sciences
- First award: 1960
- Currently held by: Remy Le Boeuf — "First Snow" (2026)
- Website: grammy.com

The Grammy Award for Best Instrumental Composition (including its previous names) has been awarded since 1960. The award is presented to the composer of an original piece of music (not an adaptation), first released during the eligibility year. In theory, any style of music is eligible for this category, but winning compositions are usually in the jazz or film score genres.

== History ==
The Grammy is awarded to the composer(s) of the music, not to the performing artist, except if the artist is also the composer. There have been several minor changes to the name of the award:

- In 1959 it was awarded as Best Musical Composition First Recorded and Released in 1958 (over 5 minutes duration)
- In 1960 it was awarded as Best Musical Composition First Recorded and Released in 1959 (more than 5 minutes duration)
- In 1962 it was awarded as Best Instrumental Theme or Instrumental Version of Song
- From 1963 to 1964 and from 1967 to 1970 it was awarded as Best Instrumental Theme
- In 1965 it was awarded as Best Instrumental Composition (other than jazz)
- From 1971 to the present it has been awarded as Best Instrumental Composition

Years reflect the year in which the Grammy Awards were presented, for works released in the previous year.

=== 1950s ===
Year^{[I]}	Nominee(s)	Work	Artist(s)
1958	Nelson Riddle	Cross Country Suite	Nelson Riddle
1958	Samuel Barber	Vanessa	Dimitri Mitropoulos
1958	Johnny Mandel	I Want to Live!	Johnny Mandel
1958	Richard Rodgers	Victory at Sea, Vol. II	Robert Russell Bennett
1958	Kurt Weill	Mahagonny	Lotte Lenya
1959	Duke Ellington	Anatomy of a Murder	Duke Ellington
1959	Morton Gould	"St. Lawrence Suite"	Morton Gould
1959	Henry Mancini	More Music from Peter Gunn	Henry Mancini
1959	Sergei Prokofiev	Prokoviev: The Overture Russe Op.72	Jean Martinon conducting the Paris Conservatoire Orchestra
1959	Dmitri Shostakovich	Shostakovich: Concerto #2 for Piano and Orchestra, Op. 101	Leonard Bernstein conducting the New York Philharmonic

=== 1960s ===
Year^{[I]}	Nominee(s)	Work	Artist(s)
1962	Galt MacDermot	African Waltz	Cannonball Adderley
1962	Duke Ellington	Paris Blues	Duke Ellington
1962	Bob Merrill	"Theme from Carnival!"	Original Broadway Cast
1962	Nino Rota	La Dolce Vita	Nino Rota
1962	Dimitri Tiomkin	The Guns of Navarone	Dimitri Tiomkin
1963	Ric Marlow and Bobby Scott	"A Taste of Honey"	Eddie Cano
1963	Elmer Bernstein and Mack David	"Walk on the Wild Side"	Elmer Bernstein
1963	Acker Bilk	"Stranger on the Shore"	Acker Bilk
1963	Henry Mancini	"Baby Elephant Walk"	Henry Mancini
1963	Nelson Riddle	Route 66 Theme	Nelson Riddle
1963	Dave Rose	"The Stripper"	Dave Rose
1964	Norman Newell, Nino Oliviero and Riz Ortolani	"More (Theme from Mondo Cane)"	Vic Dana
1964	Steve Allen and Ray Brown	"Gravy Waltz"	Steve Allen
1964	Bob Goldstein and David Shire	"Washington Square"	The Village Stompers
1964	Maurice Jarre	Lawrence of Arabia	Maurice Jarre
1964	Jean "Toots" Theilemans	"Bluesette"	Jean "Toots" Theilemans
1965	Henry Mancini	"The Pink Panther Theme"	Henry Mancini
1965	Lee Adams and Charles Strouse	"Theme from Golden Boy"	Various Artists (Quincy Jones and Sammy Kaye)
1965	Russ Daymon	"Cotton Candy"	Al Hirt
1965	Buddy Killen and Billy Sherrill	"Sugar Lips"	Al Hirt
1965	Jack Marshall	"Theme from The Munsters"	Various Artists
1967	Neal Hefti	"Batman Theme"	Neal Hefti
1967	D. J. Edwards	"Trumpet Pickin'"	Al Hirt
1967	Priscilla Hubbard	"Prissy"	Chet Atkins
1967	Henry Mancini	"Arabesque"	Henry Mancini
1967	Alex North	"Who's Afraid?"	Alex North
1968	Lalo Schifrin	"Mission: Impossible"	Lalo Schifrin
1968	Burt Bacharach and Hal David	"Casino Royale"	Herb Alpert and the Tijuana Brass
1968	Chico Buarque de Hollanda	"A Banda"	Herb Alpert and the Tijuana Brass
1968	Hugo Montenegro	"Hurry Sundown"	Hugo Montenegro
1968	Josef Zawinul	"Mercy, Mercy, Mercy"	Cannonball Adderley Quintet
1969	Mason Williams	"Classical Gas"	Mason Williams
1969	Neal Hefti	The Odd Couple	Neal Hefti
1969	Krzysztof Komeda	"Rosemary's Baby"	Rick Powell
1969	Hugo Montenegro and Ennio Morricone	"The Good, the Bad and the Ugly"	Hugo Montenegro
1969	Lalo Schifrin	"Theme from The Fox"	Lalo Schifrin

=== 1970s ===
Year^{[I]}	Nominee(s)	Work	Artist(s)
1970	John Barry	"Midnight Cowboy"	John Barry
1970	Robert Cobert	"Quentin's Theme"	The Charles Randolph Grean Sounde
1970	Quincy Jones	"Mackenna's Gold (Main Title)"	Quincy Jones
1970	Herbie Mann	Memphis Underground	Herbie Mann
1970	Bobby Warren and Harlow Wilcox	"Groovy Grubworm"	Harlow Wilcox and the Oakies
1971	Alfred Newman	"Airport Love Theme"	Alfred Newman
1971	Miles Davis	"Bitches Brew"	Miles Davis
1971	Quincy Jones	"Gula Matari"	Quincy Jones
1971	Henry Mancini	"Love Theme from Sunflower"	Henry Mancini
1971	Lalo Schifrin	"Theme from Medical Center"	Lalo Schifrin
1972	Michel Legrand	"Theme from Summer of '42"	Michel Legrand
1972	Duke Ellington	New Orleans Suite	Duke Ellington
1972	Isaac Hayes	"Theme from Shaft"	Isaac Hayes
1972	Francis Lai	"Theme from Love Story"	Francis Lai and His Orchestra / Henry Mancini and His Orchestra
1972	Chuck Mangione	"Hill Where the Lord Hides"	Chuck Mangione
1973	Michel Legrand	"Brian's Song"	Michel Legrand
1973	Don Ellis	"Theme from The French Connection"	Don Ellis Big Band
1973	Joe Greene and Billy Preston	"Outa-Space"	Billy Preston
1973	Henry Mancini	"Brass on Ivory"	Henry Mancini
1973	Nino Rota	"Theme from The Godfather"	Nino Rota
1974	Gato Barbieri	"Theme from Last Tango in Paris"	Chuck Mangione / Herb Alpert
1974	Jan Akkerman and Thijs van Leer	"Hocus Pocus"	Focus
1974	Manu Dibango	"Soul Makossa"	Manu Dibango
1974	Billy Preston	"Space Race"	Billy Preston
1974	Edgar Winter	"Frankenstein"	Edgar Winter
1975	Mike Oldfield	"Tubular Bells — Theme from The Exorcist"	Mike Oldfield
1975	Benny Golson	"Along Came Betty"	Quincy Jones
1975	Herbie Hancock, Paul Jackson, Harvey Mason and Bennie Maupin	"Chameleon"	Herbie Hancock
1975	Barry White	"Barry's Theme"	Barry White
1975	Barry White	"Rhapsody in White"	Barry White
1976	Michel Legrand	"Images"	Michel Legrand and Phil Woods
1976	Pete Clarence Carpenter and Mike Post	"The Rockford Files"	Mike Post
1976	Sylvester Levay and Stephen Prager	"Fly, Robin, Fly"	Silver Convention
1976	Chuck Mangione	"Chase the Clouds Away"	Chuck Mangione
1976	Van McCoy	"The Hustle"	Van McCoy
1977	Chuck Mangione	"Bellavia"	Chuck Mangione
1977	Henry Mancini	"The White Dawn"	Henry Mancini
1977	Chick Corea	"Leprechaun's Dream"	Chick Corea
1977	Louis Johnson, Quincy Jones and Johnny Mandel	"Midnight Soul Patrol"	Quincy Jones
1977	Skip Scarborough and Maurice White	"Earth, Wind & Fire"	Earth, Wind & Fire
1977	Stevie Wonder	"Contusion"	Stevie Wonder
1978	John Williams	"Star Wars — Main Title"	John Williams
1978	Carol Connors, Bill Conti and Ayn Robbins	"Gonna Fly Now (Theme from Rocky)"	Maynard Ferguson
1978	Gerald Fried and Quincy Jones	"Roots Medley (Motherland, Roots, Mural Theme)"	Quincy Jones
1978	Marvin Hamlisch	"Bond '77/James Bond Theme"	Marvin Hamlisch
1978	Josef Zawinul	"Birdland"	Weather Report
1979	John Williams	"Theme from Close Encounters of the Third Kind"	John Williams
1979	Nick Ashford, Quincy Jones and Valerie Simpson	"End of the Yellow Brick Road"	Ashford & Simpson
1979	Chick Corea	"Friends"	Chick Corea
1979	Chuck Mangione	"Consuelo's Love Theme"	Chuck Mangione Group
1979	Lee Ritenour	"The Captain's Journey"	Lee Ritenour

=== 1980s ===
Year^{[I]}	Nominee(s)	Work	Artist(s)
1980	John Williams	"Superman Main Title Theme"	John Williams
1980	Andy Armer and Randy Badazz	"Rise"	Herb Alpert
1980	Chick Corea	"Central Park"	Chick Corea
1980	Bob James	"Angela (Theme from Taxi)"	Bob James
1980	Marian McPartland	"Ambiance"	Marian McPartland
1981	John Williams	"The Empire Strikes Back"	John Williams
1981	Chuck Mangione	"Give It All You Got"	Chuck Mangione
1981	John Williams	"Yoda's Theme"	John Williams
1981	John Williams	"Imperial March (Darth Vader's Theme)"	John Williams
1981	Patrick Williams	"An American Concerto"	Patrick Williams
1982	Mike Post	"The Theme from Hill Street Blues"	Mike Post
1982	John Corigliano	"Altered States"	John Corigliano
1982	Jerry Goldsmith	"The Slaves"	Jerry Goldsmith
1982	Lyle Mays and Pat Metheny	As Falls Wichita, So Falls Wichita Falls	Pat Metheny and Lyle Mays
1982	Gerry Mulligan	"For an Unfinished Woman"	Gerry Mulligan
1983	John Williams	"Flying — Theme from E.T. the Extra-Terrestrial"	John Williams
1983	Lyle Mays and Pat Metheny	"Are You Going with Me?"	Pat Metheny Group
1983	Claus Ogerman	"In the Presence and Absence of Each Other (Parts 1, 2 and 3)"	Claus Ogerman featuring Michael Brecker
1983	Tom Scott	Desire	Tom Scott
1983	John Williams	"Adventure on Earth"	John Williams
1984	Giorgio Moroder	"Love Theme from Flashdance"	Helen St. John
1984	Michael Beinhorn, Herbie Hancock and Bill Laswell	"Rockit"	Herbie Hancock
1984	Dave Grusin	"An Actor's Life"	Dave Grusin
1984	Henry Mancini	"The Thorn Birds Theme"	Henry Mancini
1984	Dan Sembello and Michael Sembello	"Dream Hunter"	Sergio Mendes
1985	Randy Newman (TIE)	"The Natural"	Randy Newman
1985	John Williams (TIE)	"Olympic Fanfare and Theme"	John Williams
1985	Elmer Bernstein	"Ghostbusters (Main Title Theme)"	Elmer Bernstein
1985	Pete Carpenter and Mike Post	"The A-Team"	Mike Post
1985	Wynton Marsalis	"Hot House Flowers"	Wynton Marsalis
1986	Jan Hammer	"Miami Vice Theme"	Jan Hammer
1986	Harold Faltermeyer	"Axel F"	Harold Faltermeyer
1986	David Foster	"Love Theme from St. Elmo's Fire"	David Foster
1986	Thad Jones	"With Bells On"	Louis Bellson
1986	Alan Silvestri	"Back to the Future"	Alan Silvestri
1987	John Barry	"Out of Africa"	John Barry
1987	Bruce Broughton	Young Sherlock Holmes (Music from the Motion Picture Soundtrack)	Bruce Broughton conducting The Sinfonia of London
1987	Chick Corea	"Elektric City"	Chick Corea
1987	Harold Faltermeyer	"Top Gun Anthem"	Harold Faltermeyer and Steve Stevens
1987	Dave Grusin and Lee Ritenour	"Earth Run"	Lee Ritenour
1987	James Horner	Aliens (Original Motion Picture Soundtrack)	James Horner
1987	Wynton Marsalis	"J Mood"	Wynton Marsalis
1988	Ron Carter, Herbie Hancock, Billy Higgins and Wayne Shorter	"Call Sheet Blues"	Dexter Gordon
1988	Claude Bolling	Bolling: Suite No. 2 for Flute and Jazz Piano Trio	Claude Bolling, Jean-Pierre Rampal, Pierre-Yves Sorin and Vincent Cordelette
1988	Henry Mancini	"The Blues in Three"	Henry Mancini
1988	Lyle Mays and Pat Metheny	"Minuano (Six Eight)"	Pat Metheny Group
1988	Frank Zappa	"Jazz from Hell"	Frank Zappa
1989	Mike Post	"The Theme from L.A. Law"	Mike Post
1989	Chick Corea	"Eternal Child"	Chick Corea Elektric Band
1989	Benny Carter	"Central City Sketches (Side 2)"	Benny Carter
1989	David Foster	"Winter Games"	David Foster
1989	John Williams	"Olympic Spirit"	John Williams

=== 1990s ===
Year^{[I]}	Nominee(s)	Work	Artist(s)
1990	Danny Elfman	"The Batman Theme"	Sinfonia of London Orchestra
1990	Chick Corea	"Morning Sprite"	Chick Corea Akoustic Band
1990	Dave Grusin	"Suite from The Milagro Beanfield War"	Dave Grusin
1990	James Horner	"Field of Dreams"	James Horner
1990	Pat Metheny	"Letter from Home"	Pat Metheny Group
1990	Alan Silvestri	"Who Framed Roger Rabbit Suite"	John Scott
1991	Pat Metheny	"Change of Heart"	Roy Haynes, Dave Holland & Pat Metheny
1991	Pat Metheny	"The Chief"	Gary Burton
1991	Harry Connick Jr. and Joe Livingston	"One Last Pitch (Take Two)"	Harry Connick Jr. Trio
1991	Walter Afanasieff and Kenny G	"Going Home"	Kenny G
1992	Elton John	"Basque"	James Galway
1992	Herb Alpert and Greg Smith	"North on South St."	Herb Alpert
1992	Béla Fleck, Howard Levy, Roy Wooten and Victor Wooten	"Blu-Bop"	Béla Fleck and the Flecktones
1992	Eric Johnson	"Cliffs of Dover"	Eric Johnson
1992	Claus Ogerman	"Corfu"	Claus Ogerman and Michael Brecker
1993	Benny Carter	"Harlem Renaissance Suite"	Benny Carter
1993	Pat Metheny	"The Truth Will Always Be"	Pat Metheny
1993	Astor Piazzolla	"Oblivion"	Ettore Stratta
1993	Béla Fleck	"Magic Fingers"	Béla Fleck and the Flecktones
1993	Wynton Marsalis	"Blue Interlude"	Wynton Marsalis Septet
1994	Kenny G	"Forever in Love"	Kenny G
1994	Dave Brubeck	"Autumn"	Dave Brubeck, Chris Brubeck and Dan Brubeck
1994	Chick Corea	"Blue Miles"	Chick Corea Elektric Band II
1994	Lyle Mays	"Bill Evans"	Lyle Mays
1994	Lyle Mays and Pat Metheny	"Half Life of Absolution"	Pat Metheny Group
1995	Michael Brecker	"African Skies"	Michael Brecker
1995	Louie Bellson	"Ellington-Strayhorn Suite"	Louie Bellson
1995	Benny Carter	"Elegy in Blue"	Benny Carter
1995	Arturo Sandoval	"A Mis Abuelos"	Arturo Sandoval
1995	Maria Schneider	"Evanescence"	Maria Schneider Jazz Orchestra
1996	Bill Holman	"A View from the Side"	The Bill Holman Band
1996	Billy Childs	"The Starry Night"	Billy Childs
1996	Chick Corea	"New Life"	Chick Corea
1996	Marcus Miller and Allen Toussaint	"Tales"	Marcus Miller
1996	Billy Taylor	"Homage Part I"	Billy Taylor
1997	Herbie Hancock and Jean Hancock	"Manhattan (Island of Lights and Love)"	Herbie Hancock
1997	Jorge Calandrelli	"The Fifth Season"	Eddie Daniels
1997	Billy Childs	"Aaron's Song"	Billy Childs
1997	Arturo Sandoval	"Real McBop"	Arturo Sandoval
1997	Wayne Shorter	"Midnight in Carlotta's Hair"	Wayne Shorter
1998	Wayne Shorter	"Aung San Suu Kyi"	Herbie Hancock and Wayne Shorter
1998	Alan Broadbent	"Everytime I Think of You"	Alan Broadbent
1998	Bob Florence	"Earth"	The Bob Florence Limited Edition
1998	J. J. Johnson	"Cannon for Bela"	J. J. Johnson
1998	Bob Mintzer	"New Rochelle"	Yellowjackets
1999	Bela Fleck, Future Man and Victor Lemonte Wooten	"Almost 12"	Bela Fleck and the Flecktones
1999	Jorge Calandrelli and Astor Piazzolla	"Tango Remembrances"	Yo-Yo Ma
1999	Wynton Marsalis	"The Midnight Blues"	Wynton Marsalis
1999	Bob Mintzer	"Ellis Island"	Bob Mintzer Big Band
1999	Gerald Wilson	"Romance"	The Gerald Wilson Orchestra

=== 2000s ===
Year^{[I]}	Nominee(s)	Work	Artist(s)
2000	Don Sebesky	"Joyful Noise Suite"	Don Sebesky
2000	David Benoit	"Dad's Room"	David Benoit
2000	Chick Corea	"Little Flamenco"	Chick Corea and Origin
2000	Paquito D'Rivera	"Tropicana Nights"	Paquito D'Rivera
2000	KC Porter and Carlos Santana	"El Farol"	Santana
2001	John Williams	"Theme from Angela's Ashes"	John Williams
2001	Gordon Goodwin	"Sing, Sang, Sung"	Gordon Goodwin's Big Phat Band
2001	James Newton Howard	"The Egg Travels"	James Newton Howard
2001	Paul McCandless	"Round Robin"	Oregon with The Moscow Tchaikovsky Symphony Orchestra
2001	Ralph Towner	"The Templars"	Oregon with The Moscow Tchaikovsky Symphony Orchestra
2002	Alan Silvestri	"Cast Away — End Credits"	Alan Silvestri
2002	Tan Dun	"The Eternal Vow"	Tan Dun
2002	John Patitucci	"Communion"	John Patitucci
2002	Gonzalo Rubalcaba	"Oren (Pray)"	Gonzalo Rubalcaba
2002	Patrick Williams	"Theme from Blonde"	Patrick Williams
2003	Thomas Newman	"Six Feet Under Title Theme"	Thomas Newman
2003	James Newton Howard	"Signs — Main Titles"	James Newton Howard
2003	Randy Newman	"The Ride of the Doors"	Randy Newman
2003	Kenny Werner	"Inspiration"	Toots Thielemans and Kenny Werner
2003	John Williams	"Hedwig's Theme"	John Williams
2004	Wayne Shorter	"Sacajawea"	Wayne Shorter
2004	Michael Brecker	"Broadband"	Michael Brecker Quindectet
2004	Gordon Goodwin	"Hunting Wabbits"	Gordon Goodwin's Big Phat Band
2004	Vince Mendoza	"Amoroso"	Stefano Di Battista
2004	Kim Richmond	"Precious Promises"	The Kim Richmond Concert Jazz Orchestra
2005	Paquito D'Rivera	"Merengue"	Yo-Yo Ma
2005	Maria Schneider	"Three Romances"	University of Miami Concert Jazz Band
2005	Slide Hampton	"Past Present & Future"	The Vanguard Jazz Orchestra
2005	Maria Schneider	"Bulería, Soleá y Rumba"	Maria Schneider Orchestra
2005	Gabriel Yared	"Ada Plays (from Cold Mountain)"	Gabriel Yared
2006	Billy Childs	"Into the Light"	Billy Childs Ensemble
2006	Michael Giacchino	"The Incredits"	Various Artists
2006	John Williams	"Anakin's Betrayal"	John Williams and The London Symphony Orchestra and London Voices
2006	John Williams	"The Ferry Scene"	John Williams
2007	John Williams	"A Prayer for Peace"	John Williams
2007	Taylor Eigsti	"Argument"	Taylor Eigsti
2007	Fred Hersch	"Valentine"	Fred Hersch
2007	John Williams	"Sayuri's Theme and End Credits"	John Williams, Yo-Yo Ma and Itzhak Perlman
2007	Patrick Williams	"A Concerto in Swing"	The Henry Mancini Institute Orchestra and Big Band
2008	Maria Schneider	"Cerulean Skies"	Maria Schneider Orchestra
2008	Harry Connick Jr.	"Ash Wednesday"	Harry Connick Jr.
2008	Béla Fleck	"Spectacle"	Chick Corea and Béla Fleck
2008	Philip Glass	"I Knew Her (from Notes on a Scandal)"	Philip Glass
2008	Mark Walker	"Deep Six"	Oregon
2009	John Williams	"The Adventures of Mutt"	John Williams
2009	Chick Corea	"Alegria"	Chick Corea and Gary Burton
2009	Russell Ferrante	"Claire's Closet"	Yellowjackets and Mike Stern
2009	Gordon Goodwin	"Hit the Ground Running"	Gordon Goodwin's Big Phat Band
2009	Dave Grusin	"Danzón de Etiqueta"	Lee Ritenour and Dave Grusin

=== 2010s ===
Year^{[I]}	Nominee(s)	Work	Artist(s)
2010	Michael Giacchino	"Married Life"	Michael Giacchino
2010	Tim Davies	"Counting to Infinity"	Tim Davies Big Band
2010	Paquito D'Rivera	"Borat in Syracuse"	Paquito D'Rivera Quintet
2010	Bob Florence	"Fluffy"	Bob Florence Limited Edition
2010	Steve Wiest	"Ice-Nine"	University of North Texas One O'Clock Lab Band
2011	Billy Childs	"The Path Among the Trees"	Billy Childs Ensemble
2011	Gerald Clayton	"Battle Circles"	Clayton Brothers
2011	Bill Cunliffe	"Fourt Stream... La Banda"	Temple University Symphony Orchestra
2011	Tim Hagans	"Box of Cannoli"	The Norrbotten Big Band
2011	Patrick Williams	"Aurora"	Patrick Williams Big Band
2012	Béla Fleck and Howard Levy	"Life in Eleven"	Béla Fleck and the Flecktones
2012	Randy Brecker	"I Talk to the Trees"	Randy Brecker with DR Big Band
2012	Russell Ferrante	"Timeline"	Yellowjackets
2012	Gordon Goodwin	"Hunting Wabbits 3 (Get Off My Lawn)"	Gordon Goodwin's Big Phat Band
2012	John Hollenbeck	"Falling Men"	John Hollenbeck, Daniel Yvinec and Orchestre National de Jazz
2013	Chick Corea	"Mozart Goes Dancing"	Chick Corea and Gary Burton
2013	Chris Brubeck and Dave Brubeck	"Music of Ansel Adams: America"	Temple University Symphony Orchestra
2013	Bill Cunliffe	"Overture, Waltz and Rondo"	Temple University Symphony Orchestra
2013	Bill Holman	"Without a Paddle"	Tall & Small
2013	Chuck Loeb	"December Dream"	Fourplay
2014	Clare Fischer	"Pensamientos for Solo Alto Saxophone and Chamber Orchestra"	The Clare Fischer Orchestra
2014	Gordon Goodwin	"California Pictures for String Quartet"	Quartet San Francisco
2014	Scott Healy	"Koko on the Boulevard"	Scott Healy Ensemble
2014	Vince Mendoza	"String Quartet No. 1: Funky Diversion in Three Parts"	Quartet San Francisco
2014	Chuck Owen	"Bound Away"	Chuck Owen and the Jazz Surge
2015	John Williams	"The Book Thief"	John Williams
2015	Stanley Clarke	"Last Train to Sanity"	Stanley Clarke Band
2015	Gordon Goodwin	"Life in the Bubble"	Gordon Goodwin's Big Phat Band
2015	Edgar Meyer and Chris Thile	"Tarnation"	Edgar Meyer and Chris Thile
2015	Rufus Reid	"Recognition"	Rufus Reid
2016	Arturo O'Farrill	"The Afro Latin Jazz Suite"	Arturo O'Farrill and the Afro Latin Jazz Orchestra featuring Rudresh Mahanthappa
2016	David Balakrishnan	"Confetti Man"	Turtle Island Quartet
2016	Rich DeRosa	"Neil"	University of North Texas One O'Clock Lab Band
2016	Marshall Gilkes	"Vesper"	Marshall Gilkes and WDR Big Band
2016	Bob Mintzer	"Civil War"	Bob Mintzer Big Band
2017	Ted Nash	"Spoken at Midnight"	Ted Nash Big Band
2017	Tim Davies	"The Expensive Train Set (An Epic Sarahnade for Double Big Band)"	Tim Davies Big Band
2017	Alan Ferber	"Flow"	Alan Ferber Nonet
2017	Ennio Morricone	"L'Ultima Diligenza di Red Rock — Versione Integrale"	Ennio Morricone
2017	Thomas Newman	"Bridge of Spies (End Title)"	Thomas Newman
2018	Arturo O'Farrill	"Three Revolutions"	Arturo O'Farrill and Chucho Valdés
2018	Pascal Le Boeuf	"Alkaline"	Le Boeuf Brothers and JACK Quartet
2018	Vince Mendoza	"Chorus #3"	Vince Mendoza and WDR Big Band Cologne
2018	Chuck Owen	"Warped Cowboy"	Chuck Owen and the Jazz Surge
2018	Nate Smith	"Home Free (For Peter Joe)"	Nate Smith
2019	Terence Blanchard	"Blut und Boden (Blood and Soil)"	Terence Blanchard
2019	Alexandre Desplat	"The Shape of Water"	Alexandre Desplat
2019	Jeremy Kittel	"Chrysalis"	Kittel & Co.
2019	John Powell and John Williams	"Mine Mission"	John Powell and John Williams
2019	Alan Silvestri	"Infinity War"	Alan Silvestri

=== 2020s ===
Year^{[I]}	Nominee(s)	Work	Artist(s)
2020	John Williams	"Star Wars: Galaxy's Edge Symphonic Suite"	John Williams
2020	Fred Hersch	"Begin Again"	Fred Hersch and WDR Big Band conducted by Vince Mendoza
2020	Brian Lynch	"Crucible for Crisis"	Brian Lynch Big Band
2020	Christian McBride	"Walkin' Funny"	Christian McBride
2020	Vince Mendoza	"Love, A Beautiful Force"	Vince Mendoza, Terell Stafford, Dick Oatts and the Temple University Studio Orchestra
2021	Maria Schneider	"Sputnik"	Maria Schneider Orchestra
2021	Alexandre Desplat	"Plumfield"	Alexandre Desplat
2021	Remy Le Boeuf	"Strata"	Remy Le Boeuf's Assembly of Shadows featuring Anna Webber and Eric Miller
2021	Arturo O'Farrill	"Baby Jack"	Arturo O'Farrill and the Afro Latin Jazz Orchestra
2021	Christian Sands	"Be Water II"	Christian Sands
2022	Lyle Mays	"Eberhard"	Lyle Mays
2022	Vince Mendoza	"Concerto for Orchestra: Finale"	Vince Mendoza and the Czech National Symphony Orchestra featuring Antonio Sánchez and Derrick Hodge
2022	Tom Nazziola	"Cat and Mouse"	Tom Nazziola
2022	Arturo O'Farrill	"Dreaming in Lions: Dreaming in Lions"	Arturo O'Farrill and the Afro Latin Jazz Ensemble
2022	Brandee Younger	"Beautiful Is Black"	Brandee Younger
2023	Geoffrey Keezer	"Refuge"	Geoffrey Keezer
2023	Paquito D'Rivera	"African Tales"	Tasha Warren and Dave Eggar
2023	Pascal Le Boeuf	"Snapshots"	Tasha Warren and Dave Eggar
2023	Danilo Pérez	"Fronteras (Borders) Suite: Al-Musafir Blues"	Danilo Pérez featuring The Global Messengers
2023	Miguel Zenón	"El Pais Invisible"	Miguel Zenón, José Antonio Zayas Cabán, Ryan Smith and Casey Rafn
2024	John Williams	"Helena's Theme"	John Williams
2024	Lakecia Benjamin	"Amerikkan Skin"	Lakecia Benjamin featuring Angela Davis
2024	Gordon Goodwin and Raymond Scott	"Cutey and the Dragon"	Quartet San Francisco featuring Gordon Goodwin's Big Phat Band
2024	Ludwig Göransson	"Can You Hear the Music"	Ludwig Göransson
2024	Edgar Meyer	"Motion"	Béla Fleck, Edgar Meyer and Zakir Hussain featuring Rakesh Chaurasia
2025	Pascal Le Boeuf	"Strands"	Akropolis Reed Quintet, Pascal Le Boeuf and Christian Euman
2025	André 3000, Surya Botofasina, Nate Mercereau and Carlos Niño	"I Swear, I Really Wanted to Make a 'Rap' Album but This Is Literally the Way the Wind Blew Me This Time"	André 3000
2025	Shelton G. Berg	"At Last"	Shelly Berg
2025	Chick Corea	"Remembrance"	Chick Corea and Béla Fleck
2025	Christopher Zuar	"Communion"	Christopher Zuar Orchestra
2026	Remy Le Boeuf	"First Snow"	Nordkraft Big Band, Remy Le Boeuf and Danielle Wertz
2026	Zain Effendi	"Opening"	Zail Effendi
2026	Ludwig Göransson	"Why You Here / Before the Sun Went Down"	Ludwig Göransson featuring Miles Caton
2026	Miho Hazama	"Live Life This Day: Movement 1"	Miho Hazama, Danish Radio Big Band and Danish National Symphony Orchestra
2026	Sierra Hull	"Lord, That's a Long Way"	Sierra Hull
2026	John Powell and Stephen Schwartz	"Train to Emerald City"	John Powell and Stephen Schwartz
2026	Winner TBA on 7 February 2027		
2026	J.D. Beck, Noé Degalle & Domi Louna	"Épilogue"	Domi & J.D. Beck
2026	Chris Eldridge, Brittany Haas, Paul Kowert, Noam Pikelny & Chris Tile	"Found in a Frozen Fog"	Punch Brothers
2026	Arkai & Lindsey Stirling	"King of Coins"	Arkai & Lindsey Stirling
2026	John Williams	"Listen... (From Disclosure Day)"	John Williams
2026	Kathryn Bostic	"Solace (Compassion)"	Andreas Graf, London Symphony Orchestra & Ben Palmer

== Multiple wins ==
12 wins

- John Williams

3 wins

- Michel Legrand
- Wayne Shorter

2 wins

- John Barry
- Billy Childs
- Bela Fleck
- Herbie Hancock
- Arturo O'Farrill
- Mike Post
- Maria Schneider

== Multiple nominations ==
21 nominations

- John Williams

12 nominations

- Chick Corea

9 nominations

- Henry Mancini

8 nominations

- Pat Metheny

7 nominations

- Gordon Goodwin

6 nominations

- Lyle Mays

5 nominations

- Quincy Jones
- Chuck Mangione
- Vince Mendoza
- Maria Schneider

4 nominations

- Billy Childs
- Dave Grusin
- Herbie Hancock
- Wynton Marsalis
- Arturo O'Farrill
- Mike Post
- Wayne Shorter
- Alan Silvestri
- Patrick Williams

3 nominations

- Benny Carter
- Paquito D'Rivera
- Duke Ellington
- Pascal Le Boeuf
- Michel Legrand
- Bob Mintzer
- Lalo Schifrin

2 nominations

- John Barry
- Elmer Bernstein
- Michael Brecker
- Dave Brubeck
- Jorge Calandrelli
- Harry Connick Jr.
- Tim Davies
- Alexandre Desplat
- Harold Faltermeyer
- Russell Ferrante
- Béla Fleck
- Bob Florence
- David Foster
- Kenny G
- Michael Giacchino
- Ludwig Göransson
- Neal Hefti
- Fred Hersch
- Bill Holman
- James Horner
- James Newton Howard
- Howard Levy
- Johnny Mandel
- Edgar Meyer
- Hugo Montenegro
- Ennio Morricone
- Randy Newman
- Thomas Newman
- Claus Ogerman
- Chuck Owen
- Astor Piazzolla
- John Powell
- Billy Preston
- Nelson Riddle
- Lee Ritenour
- Nino Rota
- Arturo Sandoval
- Barry White
- Josef Zawinul
