= Raiders of the Lost Ark (soundtrack) =

Film score to the 1981 Steven Spielberg film

Film score by John Williams
- Released: June 1981
- Recorded: February 1981
- Studio: Abbey Road Studios
- Genre: Film score
- Length: 43:00
- Label: Columbia; CBS International

John Williams chronology
The Empire Strikes Back	Raiders of the Lost Ark	E.T. the Extra-Terrestrial

Indiana Jones chronology
Raiders of the Lost Ark	Indiana Jones and the Temple of Doom

Professional ratings
Review scores
Source	Rating
AllMusic	5/5 stars
Filmtracks	5/5 stars
Movie Wave	5/5 stars

Raiders of the Lost Ark: Original Motion Picture Soundtrack is the film score to the 1981 Steven Spielberg film, Raiders of the Lost Ark. The music was composed and conducted by John Williams and performed by the London Symphony Orchestra. The orchestrations were provided by Herbert W. Spencer and Al Woodbury. The score was released by Columbia Records in June 1981. The soundtrack received an Academy Award nomination for Best Original Score but lost out to Vangelis' score for Chariots of Fire.

This was one of the first scores recorded at Abbey Road Studios (formerly known as EMI Studios) after Anvil Studios shut down in 1980.

== Composition ==
Williams said that the music did not have to be serious for the film and was instead theatrical and excessive. Williams spent a few weeks working on the Indiana Jones theme, more commonly known as "The Raiders March" that plays during the main character's heroic scenes. Two separate pieces were played for Spielberg, who wanted to use both. These pieces became the main theme and musical bridge of "The Raiders March". A picture disc vinyl LP of "The Raiders March" was released by Walt Disney Records in 2021.

For the romantic theme, Williams took inspiration from older films like the drama Now, Voyager (1942) to create something more emotionally monumental that he felt would contrast well with the film's humor and lighter moments. Williams used "dark" orchestral pieces to represent the actions of the Nazis, using the "seventh degree on the scale of the bottom". He said this signified a militaristic evil. To create something suitably biblical for the Ark of the Covenant, he used a mix of chorus and orchestra.

== Track listing ==
"The Raiders March" (1981)
Raiders of the Lost Ark

1981 Polydor Album
No.	Title	Length
1.	"Raiders Of The Lost Ark"	6:03
2.	"Flight From Peru"	2:23
3.	"The Map Room: Dawn"	3:55
4.	"The Basket Game"	4:47
5.	"The Well Of The Souls"	4:57
6.	"Desert Chase"	7:41
7.	"Marion's Theme"	3:10
8.	"The Miracle Of The Ark"	6:11
9.	"The Raiders March"	2:29
Total length:		41:36

== Subsequent releases ==
=== Release history ===
Title	U.S. release date	Label	Format
Raiders of the Lost Ark–Original Soundtrack	June 1981	Columbia	LP, cassette and CD (1984)
Raiders of the Lost Ark (Original Motion Picture Soundtrack)–Expanded Edition	1995	DCC Compact Classics, Inc.	CD and double LP
Raiders of the Lost Ark (Original Motion Picture Soundtrack)	2008	Concord	CD and double LP (2017)
Indiana Jones and the Raiders of the Lost Ark (Original Motion Picture Soundtrack)	March 27, 2024	Walt Disney	Remastered CD
Indiana Jones and the Raiders of the Lost Ark (Original Motion Picture Soundtrack)	June 28, 2024	Walt Disney	Remastered double LP

=== Expanded edition ===
The soundtrack was re-released in an expanded edition by DCC Compact Classics, Inc. in November 1995 on CD and LP, with thirty minutes of new and extended cues and a 24-page booklet. The LP had an extended "The Well of the Souls" sequence that was absent on the CD release.

Raiders of the Lost Ark [Expanded]

Soundtrack album by John Williams
- Released: November 1995
- Genre: Soundtrack
- Length: 73:35
- Label: DCC Compact Classics, Inc.

==== Track listing ====
1995 DCC Compact Classics Album
No.	Title	Note(s)	Length
1.	"The Raiders March"	a.k.a. "The Indiana Jones Theme"	2:50
2.	"Main Title: South America, 1936"	Previously unreleased	4:10
3.	"In the Idol's Temple"	Contains previously unreleased material	5:26
4.	"Flight from Peru"		2:20
5.	"Journey to Nepal"	Previously unreleased	2:11
6.	"The Medallion"	Previously unreleased	2:55
7.	"To Cairo"		1:29
8.	"The Basket Game"	Contains previously unreleased material	5:04
9.	"The Map Room: Dawn"		3:52
10.	"Reunion and the Dig Begins"	Previously unreleased	4:10
11.	"The Well of the Souls"	Contains previously unreleased material (Extended to include "Uncovering the Ark / Marion Into the Pit" on DCC LP release)	5:28
12.	"Airplane Fight"	Previously unreleased	4:37
13.	"Desert Chase"	Contains previously unreleased material	8:15
14.	"Marion's Theme"		2:08
15.	"The German Sub / To the Nazi Hideout"	Previously unreleased	4:32
16.	"Ark Trek"	Previously unreleased	1:33
17.	"The Miracle of the Ark"		6:05
18.	"The Warehouse"	Previously unreleased	0:56
19.	"End Credits"		5:20
Total length:			73:35

=== The Indiana Jones Trilogy ===
Silva released a newly recorded version of Williams' Indiana Jones music entitled "The Indiana Jones Trilogy" on January 21, 2003. It features various cues from the first three Indiana Jones films, with seven from Raiders. However, although they use the original manuscripts, this is a re-recording performed by the City of Prague Philharmonic Orchestra.

No.	Title	Length
1.	"The Raiders March"	2:40
2.	"The Map Room / Dawn"	4:09
3.	"The Basket Game"	4:23
4.	"Marion's Theme"	3:43
5.	"Airplane Fight"	4:22
6.	"The Ark Trek"	1:29
7.	"Raiders Of The Lost Ark"	4:54
Total length:		25:40

=== Indiana Jones: The Soundtracks Collection ===
The five-disc release by Concord Records was released on November 11, 2008. The set contains the three original soundtracks to the trilogy, expanded and remastered, including material never before issued on CD. The box set also includes the standard Kingdom of the Crystal Skull soundtrack (released in May 2008, no bonus material added) plus a bonus CD that includes more music from the trilogy and an exclusive audio interview CD with Williams.

=== 2008 Concord Set ===
Disc One
No.	Title	Note(s)	Length
1.	"In the Jungle"		4:13
2.	"The Idol Temple"		3:56
3.	"Escape from the Temple"		1:34
4.	"Flight from Peru (Contains Raiders March)"		2:24
5.	"Washington Men / Indy's Home (Contains Raiders March)"	Previously Unreleased	1:06
6.	"A Thought for Marion / To Nepal (Contains Raiders March)"		2:12
7.	"The Medallion"		2:55
8.	"Flight to Cairo (Contains Raiders March)"		1:30
9.	"The Basket Game"		5:02
10.	"Bad Dates"	Previously Unreleased	1:14
11.	"The Map Room: Dawn"		3:53
12.	"Reunion in the Tent / Searching for the Well (Contains Raiders March)"		4:02
13.	"The Well of the Souls"		5:28
14.	"Indy Rides the Statue"	Previously Unreleased	1:09
15.	"The Fist Fight / The Flying Wing (Contains Raiders March)"		4:37
16.	"Desert Chase (Contains Raiders March)"		7:33
17.	"Marion's Theme / The Crate"		2:10
18.	"The German Sub"		1:23
19.	"Ride to the Nazi Hideout (Contains Raiders March)"		3:20
20.	"Indy Follows the Ark (Contains Raiders March)"		1:40
21.	"The Miracle of the Ark"		6:07
22.	"Washington Ending & Raiders March (Contains Raiders March)"		6:52
Total length:			74:20

Disc Five
No.	Title	Note(s)	Length
1.	"Raiders March"		2:30
3.	"Uncovering the Ark"	Previously Unreleased	5:32
Total length:			8:02

The re-issues of the three original soundtracks are also available in Europe as a single release. The content is identical to the first three titles in the box-set.

=== Indiana Jones: The Complete Collection Box Set ===
The 2008 edition of the soundtrack was reissued by Walt Disney Records and released alongside the other four film soundtrack albums from the series in a collective 5-CD box set on March 27, 2024.

== Missing music ==
There are about three minutes of music from Raiders of the Lost Ark that—so far—have not been released on CD.

1. Marion Into The Pit (Present on DCC LP)
2. Indy Rides The Statue (Original Film Version—Concord Release is an Alternate)

In addition to the missing music, "Desert Chase" is incomplete on the Concord set. It has been trimmed down to its 1981 album length, making the 1995 release the only complete representation of that cue.
