= E.T. the Extra-Terrestrial (soundtrack) =

E.T. the Extra-Terrestrial: Music from the Original Soundtrack

Soundtrack album by John Williams
- Released: June 11, 1982
- Recorded: March–April 1982
- Studio: MGM Scoring Stage
- Genre: Classical
- Label: MCA
- Producer: John Williams; Bruce Botnick

John Williams chronology
Raiders of the Lost Ark (1981)	E.T. the Extra-Terrestrial: Music from the Original Soundtrack (1982)	Return of the Jedi (1983)

E.T. the Extra-Terrestrial: Music from the Original Soundtrack is the score to the 1982 film of the same name composed and conducted by John Williams, and performed by the Hollywood Studio Symphony. The album was first released by MCA Records on June 11, 1982. It won the Academy Award for Best Original Score and Grammy Award for Best Score Soundtrack for Visual Media. The album was reissued in expanded form in 1996, and again in a slightly more expanded edition in 2002, before being remastered and reissued in a limited-edition two-disc set by La-La Land Records on September 26, 2017.

== Overview ==
The soundtrack for the film has been issued numerous times. The original 1982 album release was a recording of concert arrangements based on the film's music, whereas later issues contain the actual soundtrack cues as heard in the film, although most cues are alternates originally recorded for the film, but replaced by new cues.

The score was recorded at the MGM Scoring Stage in Culver City, California.

On the track "The Magic of Halloween," when E.T. sees a child wearing a Yoda costume, Williams includes a reference to "Yoda's Theme", which he had composed for The Empire Strikes Back in 1980. In 1999, George Lucas made the final link when he included three E.T.s as members of the senate in Star Wars: Episode I – The Phantom Menace (also composed by John Williams) and thereby connecting the two movies.

== Composition ==
There are almost 80 minutes of music in E.T. the Extra-Terrestrial, excluding alternates and album arrangements. The full hand-written score has in excess of 500 pages. The music was first written by Williams in 8-12-line sketch format; these were then expanded to full score by orchestrator Herbert W. Spencer from December 1981 to January 1982.

The music was orchestrated for a conventional large orchestra – for example the end credits are written for 3 flutes, 2 oboes, 2 clarinets, 3 bassoons, 4 horns in f, 3 trumpets, 3 trombones, 1 tuba, percussion section, 1 harp, 1 piano and string section. Other cues call for additional instruments such as celeste and organ.

In the course of the recordings several revisions to various cues were made; some of the original versions of these cues ended up on the 1996 or 2002 album releases.

The original 1982 soundtrack album contained a number of cues that Williams adapted and recorded specifically for the album around a month after the original film recording sessions: "Abandoned and Pursued", "E.T. and Me", "E.T.'s Halloween", "Flying" and "Over the Moon".

La-La-Land Records finally released the complete E.T. the Extra-Terrestrial score in 2017, including the full score as heard in the film, the original album-only cues, and alternate versions of cues where applicable.

One of the known anecdotes from the recording is that Williams had problems with timing of the music during the recording of the final chase which resulted in Spielberg shutting off the projector and telling Williams to record the music as he wanted it. Spielberg later edited the scenes around the recorded music.

== Track listing ==
Original release
No.	Title	Length
1.	"Three Million Light Years from Home"	2:57
2.	"Abandoned and Pursued"	2:58
3.	"E.T. and Me"	4:49
4.	"E.T.'s Halloween"	4:07
5.	"Flying"	3:20
6.	"E.T. Phone Home"	4:18
7.	"Over the Moon"	2:06
8.	"Adventure on Earth"	15:06
Total length:		39:41

1996 re-issue
No.	Title	Length
1.	"Far from Home / E.T. Alone"	6:49
2.	"Bait for E.T."	1:43
3.	"The Beginning of a Friendship"	2:50
4.	"Toys"	3:11
5.	"I'm Keeping Him"	2:19
6.	"E.T.'s Powers"	2:42
7.	"E.T. and Elliott Get Drunk"	2:53
8.	"Frogs"	2:10
9.	"At Home"	5:37
10.	"The Magic of Halloween"	2:53
11.	"Sending the Signal"	3:57
12.	"Searching for E.T."	4:16
13.	"Invading Elliott's House"	2:22
14.	"E.T. Is Dying"	2:17
15.	"Losing E.T."	2:00
16.	"E.T. Is Alive!"	4:18
17.	"Escape / Chase / Saying Goodbye"	15:04
18.	"End Credits"	3:51
Total length:		71:13

2002 re-issue
No.	Title	Length
1.	"Main Title"	1:07
2.	"Far from Home / E.T. Alone"	6:47
3.	"Bait for E.T."	1:44
4.	"Meeting E.T."	2:06
5.	"E.T.'s New Home"	1:39
6.	"The Beginning of a Friendship"	3:03
7.	"Toys"	2:44
8.	"I'm Keeping Him"	2:18
9.	"E.T.'s Powers"	2:43
10.	"E.T. and Elliott Get Drunk"	2:54
11.	"Frogs"	2:10
12.	"At Home"	5:38
13.	"The Magic of Halloween"	2:52
14.	"Sending the Signal"	3:56
15.	"Searching for E.T."	4:16
16.	"Invading Elliott's House"	2:22
17.	"E.T. Is Dying"	2:20
18.	"Losing E.T."	2:03
19.	"E.T. Is Alive!"	4:06
20.	"Escape / Chase / Saying Goodbye"	15:02
21.	"End Credits"	3:49
Total length:		75:33

2017 re-issue, disc 1
No.	Title	Length
1.	"Main Title"	1:14
2.	"Far from Home / E.T. Alone"	6:57
3.	"Bait for E.T."	1:45
4.	"Meeting E.T."	2:08
5.	"E.T.'s New Home"	1:28
6.	"The Beginning of a Friendship"	2:53
7.	"Toys"	3:13
8.	"I'm Keeping Him"	2:20
9.	"E.T's Powers"	2:44
10.	"The Closet" (Previously unreleased)	0:53
11.	"E.T. and Elliott Get Drunk"	2:57
12.	"Frogs"	2:12
13.	"At Home"	5:38
14.	"The Magic of Halloween"	2:55
15.	"Sending the Signal"	3:58
16.	"Searching for E.T."	4:18
17.	"Invading Elliott's House"	2:24
18.	"Stay with Me" (Previously unreleased)	2:24
19.	"Losing E.T."	2:04
20.	"E.T. Is Alive"	4:22
21.	"The Rescue and Bike Chase"	8:07
22.	"The Departure"	7:07
23.	"End Credits"	3:55
Total length:		77:57

2017 re-issue disc 2
No.	Title	Length
1.	"Three Million Light Years From Home"	3:01
2.	"Abandoned and Pursued"	3:02
3.	"E.T. and Me"	4:54
4.	"E.T.'s Halloween"	4:11
5.	"Flying"	3:25
6.	"E.T. Phone Home"	4:21
7.	"Over the Moon"	2:12
8.	"Adventure on Earth"	15:10
9.	"The E.T. Adventure" (Previously unreleased)	4:12
10.	"Far from Home / E.T. Alone" (Alternate; contains previously unreleased music)	7:00
11.	"The Encounter" (Previously unreleased)	1:49
12.	"Meeting E.T." (Alternate; previously unreleased)	2:20
13.	"E.T.'s New Home" (Alternate)	1:27
14.	"The Kiss" (Previously unreleased)	0:49
15.	"Levitation" (Previously unreleased)	0:41
16.	"Searching for E.T." (Alternate)	4:19
17.	"Invading Elliott's House" (Alternate; contains previously unreleased music)	2:24
18.	"E.T. Is Dying" (Alternate)	2:24
19.	"The Departure" (Alternate)	7:06
20.	"End Credits" (Alternate)	3:55
Total length:		78:42

== Awards ==
The score was the fourth in history to accomplish the feat of winning the Academy Award, Golden Globe, Grammy, and BAFTA. (The previous two, Star Wars and Jaws, were also composed by Williams, who remains the only person to have won all awards for the same score more than once.) To date, a total of only six scores have won all four awards.

== Bibliography ==
- Lawson, Matt; MacDonald, Laurence (2018), 100 Greatest Film Scores, U.S.A.: Rowman & Littlefield, ISBN 9781538103685
