= Anatomy of a Murder (soundtrack) =

Soundtrack album by Duke Ellington
- Released: July 1959
- Recorded: May 29 and June 1–2, 1959
- Studio: Radio Recorders, Los Angeles
- Genre: Jazz
- Label: Columbia

Duke Ellington chronology
Side by Side (1959)	Anatomy of a Murder (1959)	Live at the Blue Note (1959)

Singles from Anatomy of a Murder
- 1. "Anatomy Of A Murder" / "Flirtibird" Released: July 1959

Anatomy of a Murder (Music by Duke Ellington) is the original motion picture soundtrack for the 1959 film Anatomy of a Murder.

== Reception ==
Professional ratings
Review scores
Source	Rating
AllMusic	3/5 stars
The Penguin Guide to Jazz Recordings	3/4 stars
The Rolling Stone Jazz Record Guide	4/5 stars

Ellington's score won three Grammy Awards in 1959, for Best Performance by a Dance Band, Best Musical Composition First Recorded and Released in 1959 and Best Sound Track Album.

== Track listing ==
All tracks are written by Duke Ellington and Billy Strayhorn, except as indicated.

Original release
No.	Title	Length
1.	"Main Title/Anatomy of a Murder"	3:57
2.	"Flirtibird"	2:14
3.	"Way Early Subtone"	3:59
4.	"Hero to Zero"	2:11
5.	"Low Key Lightly"	3:39
6.	"Happy Anatomy" (band-movie version)	2:35
7.	"Midnight Indigo"	2:46
8.	"Almost Cried" (studio)	2:26
9.	"Sunswept Sunday"	1:53
10.	"Grace Valse"	2:30
11.	"Happy Anatomy" (P.I. Five version (Note: P.I. Five consists of Duke Ellington, Ray Nance, Jimmy Hamilton, Jimmy Woode, and James Johnson))	1:28
12.	"Haupe"	2:36
13.	"Upper and Outest"	2:23

CD reissue bonus tracks
No.	Title	Length
14.	"Anatomy of a Murder" (stereo single)	2:44
15.	"Merrily Rolling Along (aka Hero to Zero)/Sunswept Sunday" (movie stings & rehearsal)	3:49
16.	"Beer Garden"	1:53
17.	"Happy Anatomy" (band-studio five version)	2:43
18.	"Polly (aka Grace Valse, Haupe, Low Key Lightly, Midnight Indigo)"	3:35
19.	"Polly" (movie stings)	3:54
20.	"Happy Anatomy" (Dixieland version)	2:15
21.	"More Blues"	2:15
22.	"Almost Cried (aka Flirtibird)" (P.I. Five/movie version)	2:13
23.	"Soundtrack Music: Anatomy of a Murder (Duke Ellington a la Guy Lombardo)"	2:29
24.	"Anatomy of a Murder" (mono single in stereo)	2:36
25.	"The Grand Finale (Rehearsal/Lines/Interview/Music/Stings/Murder)"	10:47

== Personnel ==
- Duke Ellington: piano
- Cat Anderson, Shorty Baker, Herbie Jones, Clark Terry, Gerald Wilson: trumpet
- Ray Nance: trumpet, violin
- Quentin Jackson, Britt Woodman: trombone
- John Sanders: valve trombone
- Jimmy Hamilton: clarinet, tenor saxophone
- Johnny Hodges: alto saxophone
- Russell Procope: alto saxophone, clarinet
- Paul Gonsalves: tenor saxophone
- Harry Carney: baritone saxophone, clarinet, bass clarinet
- Jimmy Woode: bass
- James Johnson: drums
