= Indiana Jones and the Last Crusade (soundtrack) =

Album by John Williams

Film score by John Williams
- Released: 1989, 2008
- Studio: Sony Scoring Stage, Culver City
- Genre: Film score
- Length: 59:00
- Label: Warner
- Producer: John Williams

John Williams chronology
The Accidental Tourist (1988)	Indiana Jones and the Last Crusade (1989)	Stanley & Iris (1990)

Indiana Jones chronology
Indiana Jones and the Temple of Doom (1984)	Indiana Jones and the Last Crusade (1989)	Indiana Jones and the Kingdom of the Crystal Skull (2008)

Professional ratings
Review scores
Source	Rating
AllMusic	4/5 stars
Filmtracks	4/5 stars

Indiana Jones and the Last Crusade is the soundtrack to Steven Spielberg's 1989 film of the same name. It was released by Warner Records in 1989. The music was composed and conducted by John Williams and performed by the Hollywood Studio Symphony, with orchestrations provided by Herbert W. Spencer, Alexander Courage, John Neufeld and Patrick Hollenbeck.

The official album only contains key moments from the film's score and is out of print. The expanded edition was officially released by Concord Music Group in a box set with the soundtracks of the other Indiana Jones films on November 11, 2008. Williams' arrangement of the Königgrätzer Marsch, the German military march that is played during the Berlin book burning scene, does not appear on the soundtrack. The soundtrack contains a variety of leitmotifs, such as for the Nazis, the Holy Grail and the returning Indiana Jones theme.

== Track listing ==
1989 Warner Bros. Album
No.	Title	Length
1.	"Indy's Very First Adventure"	8:14
2.	"X Marks the Spot"	3:12
3.	"Scherzo for Motorcycle and Orchestra"	3:54
4.	"Ah, Rats!!!"	3:41
5.	"Escape from Venice"	4:25
6.	"No Ticket"	2:46
7.	"The Keeper of the Grail"	3:24
8.	"Keeping Up with the Joneses"	3:38
9.	"Brother of the Cruciform Sword"	1:56
10.	"Belly of the Steel Beast"	5:29
11.	"The Canyon of the Crescent Moon"	4:18
12.	"The Penitent Man Will Pass"	3:24
13.	"End Credits (Raiders March)"	10:37
Total length:		58:58

Tracks do not appear in the order that they occur in the film, but instead in a succession chosen by Williams for listening purposes

== Subsequent releases ==
=== The Indiana Jones Trilogy ===
Silva released a new version of Williams' Indiana Jones music entitled "The Indiana Jones Trilogy" on January 21, 2003. It features various cues from the entire trilogy, with four from The Last Crusade. However, although they use the original manuscripts, this is a re-recording performed by the City of Prague Philharmonic Orchestra.

No.	Title	Length
12.	"Indy's First Adventure"	8:28
13.	"X Marks The Spot / Escape From Venice"	5:23
14.	"No Ticket / Keeping Up With The Joneses"	4:07
15.	"Finale & End Credits"	11:22
Total length:		29:20

=== Indiana Jones: The Soundtracks Collection ===
The soundtrack to The Last Crusade was re-released on CD in November 2008 with expanded and remastered versions of Raiders of the Lost Ark and The Temple of Doom. The set includes material never before issued from the original albums.

=== 2008 Concord Set ===
Disc Three
No.	Title	Note(s)	Length
1.	"Indy's Very First Adventure (Contains Raiders March)"	Includes Previously Unreleased Material	12:00
2.	"The Boat Scene (Contains Raiders March)"	Previously Unreleased	2:22
3.	"X Marks the Spot (Contains Raiders March)"		3:11
4.	"Ah, Rats!!!"		3:40
5.	"Escape from Venice"		4:22
6.	"Journey to Austria"	Previously Unreleased	0:38
7.	"Father and Son Reunited"	Previously Unreleased	1:48
8.	"The Austrian Way"	Previously Unreleased	2:39
9.	"Scherzo for Motorcycle and Orchestra (Contains Raiders March)"		3:53
10.	"Alarm! (Contains Raiders March)"	Previously Unreleased	3:06
11.	"No Ticket"		2:45
12.	"Keeping Up with the Joneses"		3:37
13.	"Brother of the Cruciform Sword"		1:56
14.	"On the Tank (Contains Raiders March)"	Previously Unreleased	3:38
15.	"Belly of the Steel Beast (Contains Raiders March)"		5:28
16.	"The Canyon of the Crescent Moon (Contains Raiders March)"		4:17
17.	"The Penitent Man Will Pass"		3:23
18.	"The Keeper of the Grail"		3:23
19.	"Finale & End Credits (Contains Raiders March)"		10:39
Total length:			76:45

Disc Five
No.	Title	Note(s)	Length
6.	"Father's Study"	Previously Unreleased	2:27
7.	"Marcus is Captured / To Berlin"	Previously Unreleased	1:55
8.	"To the Blimp"	Previously Unreleased	2:03
9.	"The Blimp Turns Around (Contains Raiders March)"	Previously Unreleased	1:29
10.	"Death of Kazim"	Previously Unreleased	2:26
11.	"Wrong Choice, Right Choice"	Previously Unreleased	4:36
Total length:			14:56

=== Indiana Jones: The Complete Collection Box Set ===
The soundtrack was reissued by Walt Disney Records and released alongside the other four film soundtrack albums from the series in a collective 5-CD box set on March 27, 2024.

=== Film Order ===
For those interested in hearing the soundtrack in film order, the order is as follows:

No.	Title	Length
1.	"Indy's Very First Adventure"
2.	"The Boat Scene"
3.	"Father's Study"
4.	"X Marks the Spot"
5.	"Ah, Rats!!!"
6.	"Escape from Venice"
7.	"Journey to Austria"
8.	"Father and Son Reunited"
9.	"Marcus Is Captured/To Berlin"
10.	"The Austrian Way"
11.	"Alarm!"
12.	"Scherzo for Motorcycle and Orchestra"
13.	"To the Blimp"
14.	"No Ticket"
15.	"The Blimp Turns Around"
16.	"Keeping Up With the Joneses"
17.	"Brother of the Cruciform Sword"
18.	"The Death of Kazim"
19.	"On the Tank"
20.	"Belly of the Steel Beast"
21.	"The Canyon of the Crescent Moon"
22.	"The Penitent Man Will Pass"
23.	"The Keeper of the Grail"
24.	"Wrong Choice, Right Choice"
25.	"Finale/End Credits"
