= Remy Le Boeuf =

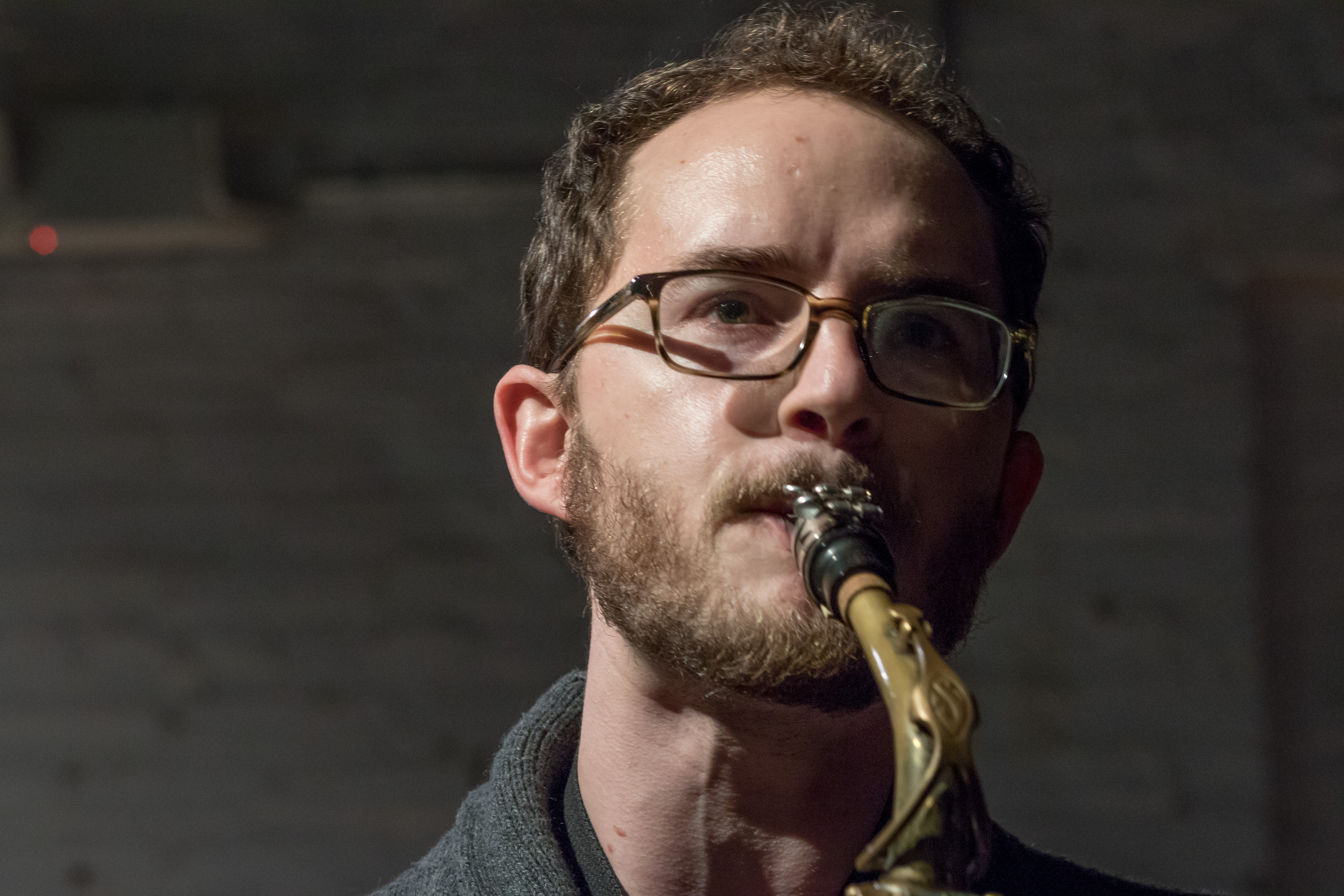
- Performing in Brooklyn, NY, 2016

Background information
- Born: August 3, 1986 (age 40); Santa Cruz, California
- Genre: Jazz
- Occupations: Saxophonist, composer, voice actor
- Instrument: Saxophone
- Years active: 2000–present
- Labels: Le Boeuf Brothers Music; Nineteen-Eight Records; New Focus Recordings/Panoramic Recordings; SoundSpore Records
- Website: www.remyleboeuf.com

Remy Le Boeuf (born August 3, 1986) is a jazz saxophonist, composer and multi-instrumentalist born in Santa Cruz, California. He leads the jazz orchestra Assembly of Shadows, co-leads the jazz group Le Boeuf Brothers, and has a successful solo career as a composer and sideman integrating jazz, classical, and indie-rock genres. The New York Times describes his music as “evocative”.

== Biography ==
Born and raised in Santa Cruz, California, Le Boeuf started playing oboe at age 10 and picked up the saxophone a year later. In high school, he began performing regularly with his twin brother, Pascal Le Boeuf, and the brothers started their modern jazz group, Le Boeuf Brothers. In 2004, Remy moved to New York City to attend the Manhattan School of Music where he received his bachelor's and master's degrees and began working professionally.

As a composer, Le Boeuf has received commissions from SFJAZZ, The Jerome Foundation, New York Youth Symphony, and Keio University. As a performer, Le Boeuf has worked as a sideman with various artists including Grammy Award-winning Bob Mintzer's Big Band, Haim, Dayna Stephens, Alan Ferber, Dave Leibman, Linda Oh, Prefuse 73, Jack Quartet, Caleb Hudson, and Donny McCaslin.

Le Boeuf has performed throughout the world including North America, Europe and Asia. He has received many honors and awards for compositions and performances including recognition from ASCAP and Downbeat magazine, both individually and as part of Le Boeuf Brothers. Additional awards include the 2015 Commission Award from SFJAZZ and the 2016 ASCAP Young Jazz Composer Award.

As of 2022, Le Boeuf is Director of Jazz and Commercial Music Studies at the University of Denver’s Lamont School of Music.

== Awards ==
Remy Le Boeuf was nominated in 2021 for a Grammy Award for Best Instrumental Composition and a Grammy Award for Best Arrangement, Instrumental or A Cappella for composing and arranging work on his album Assembly of Shadows. He was nominated again in 2023 for a Grammy Award for Best Arrangement, Instrumental or A Cappella and a Grammy Award for Best Large Jazz Ensemble Album for his album "Architecture of Storms." He would eventually win Instrumental Composition in 2026 for "First Snow".

== Discography ==
=== As Leader ===
Year	Artist	Title	Label
2025	Remy Le Boeuf, Danielle Wertz, Nordkraft Big Band	Silent Course	Gateway Music
2024	Remy Le Boeuf & Nordkraft Big Band	Strangers to Ourselves	Gateway Music
2024	Remy Le Boeuf's Assembly of Shadows	Heartland Radio	SoundSpore Records
2023	Le Boeuf Brothers	HUSH	SoundSpore Records
2023	Remy Le Boeuf	Vignettes II	SoundSpore Records
2021	Remy Le Boeuf's Assembly of Shadows	Architecture of Storms	SoundSpore Records
2019	Remy Le Boeuf's Assembly of Shadows	Assembly of Shadows	SoundSpore Records
2019	Remy Le Boeuf	Light as a Word	Outside in Music
2016	Le Boeuf Brothers + JACK Quartet	imaginist	New Focus Recordings
2013	Le Boeuf Brothers	Remixed	Nineteen-Eight Records
2011	Le Boeuf Brothers	In Praise of Shadows	Nineteen-Eight Records
2009	Le Boeuf Brothers	House Without a Door	Le Boeuf Brothers Music

=== As Sideman ===
Year	Artist	Title	Label
2024	Prefuse 73	New Strategies For Modern Crime Volume 1 & 2	Lex Records
2024	Nick Depinna	Nexus Music, Vol. 2	Orenda Records
2024	Nordkraft Big Band	The Christmas Album	Gateway Music
2023	Pascal Le Boeuf	Ritual Being	SoundSpore Records
2023	Anthony Branker & Imagine	What Place Can Be For Us?	Origin Records
2022	Manuel Valera New Cuban Express Big Band	Distancia	Greenleaf Music
2022	Martha Kato	Solúna	Somethin' Cool Label
2022	Lee Pardini	Hombodies+ (Deluxe Edition)	GroundUp
2020	Laila Biali	Out of Dust	Chronograph/ACT
2020	The Awakening Orchestra	volume ii: to call her to a higher plain	Biophilia
2017	Jonathan Saraga	Journey to a New World	Fresh Sound
2016	Benji Kaplan	Uai Sô	Independent
2016	PLNKTN	Enjoy the Quiet Life	Independent
2011	Jeff Fairbanks’ Project Hansori	Mulberry Street	BJU Records
2007	Michael Feinburg and The Glass Eye Trio	Harajuku	Independent
2006	Colin Stranahan	Transformation	Capri Records
2004	Pascal Le Boeuf	Migration	Le Boeuf Brothers Music
2000	Leonard Bernstein	Mass (Boy Soprano Soloist) cond. Boris Brott	Kultur (DVD)

=== Composer/Arranger ===
Year	Artist	Title	Label
2024	Caleb Hudson	Lex Records	Grace Note Derby
2024	Prefuse 73	New Strategies For Modern Crime Volume 1 & 2	Lex Records
2024	Sahara von Hattenberger	1Q84	Odd Sound
2024	Nordkraft Big Band	The Christmas Album	Gateway Music
2023	Colorado Jazz Repertory Orchestra	Compared to What	Indie
2021	Jennifer Wharton's Bonegasm	Not A Novelty	Sunnyside
2021	Carr-Petrova Duo	A Whole New World	Self-Released

=== Producer ===
Year	Artist	Title	Label
2025	John Sturino	Blow Globe	Outside In Muisc

== Filmography ==
Year	Title	Role	Notes
1999	Arthur's 1st Grade	The Brain	
1999	Dr. Seuss Toddler	Goslings	
2000	Arthur's Camping Adventure	The Brain	
2000	Arthur's Preschool	The Brain	
2001	Arthur's Kindergarten	The Brain	
2001	Zone of the Enders	Leo Stenbuck	
2001	Nicktoons Nick Tunes	Donnie	
2003	Zone of the Enders: The 2nd Runner	Leo Stenbuck	
