= Return of the Jedi (soundtrack) =

Film score to the 1983 film "Return of the Jedi"

Star Wars: Return of the Jedi (Original Motion Picture Soundtrack)
- Cover from the original 1983 release

Soundtrack album by John Williams
- Released: 1983
- Recorded: January–February 1983
- Studios: Abbey Road Studios, London, Olympic Studios, West London, Fox Scoring Stage, Hollywood
- Genre: Classical
- Length: 44:59
- Label: RSO
- Producer: John Williams

John Williams chronology
E.T. the Extra-Terrestrial (1982)	Star Wars: Return of the Jedi (Original Motion Picture Soundtrack) (1983)	Indiana Jones and the Temple of Doom (1984)

Star Wars: Return of the Jedi (The Original Motion Picture Soundtrack) is the film score to the 1983 film Return of the Jedi, composed and conducted by John Williams and performed by the London Symphony Orchestra. Most of the score was recorded in London between January and February 1983 at Abbey Road Studios, with one cue recorded at Olympic Studios. Again, John Williams served as producer. Herbert W. Spencer, Thomas Newman and Gordon Langford served as orchestrators. Engineer Eric Tomlinson, music editor Kenneth Wannberg, and record supervisor Lionel Newman again reprised their respective duties. The score earned another Academy Award nomination for Williams. Return of the Jedi, which is the original trilogy's shortest score, was only released on a single-LP instead of a double-set like the Star Wars and The Empire Strikes Back soundtracks before it.

The 1983 original version was remastered by Sony Classical and released on LP in 2015. A remastered version of the soundtrack was released by Walt Disney Records on May 4, 2018. This remaster was newly assembled from the highest-quality tapes available, rather than sourced from the existing 1983 album masters.

== Original 1983 release ==
=== Track listing ===
LP vinyl released by RSO; compact disc released by Polydor

Side 1
No.	Title	Length
1.	"Main Title (The Story Continues)"	5:09
2.	"Into the Trap"	2:36
3.	"Luke and Leia"	4:44
4.	"Parade of the Ewoks"	3:25
5.	"Han Solo Returns (At the Court of Jabba the Hutt)"	4:10
6.	"Lapti Nek (Jabba's Palace Band)"	2:49

Side 2
No.	Title	Length
7.	"The Forest Battle"	4:01
8.	"Rebel Briefing"	2:22
9.	"The Emperor"	2:41
10.	"The Return of the Jedi"	5:02
11.	"Ewok Celebration and Finale"	8:00

Total Time: 44:59

This track listing is also shared with the 2015 vinyl release by Sony Classical and the 2018 release by Walt Disney Records.

=== Weekly charts ===
Chart (1983)	Peak position
Australian Albums (Kent Music Report)	89
Canada Top Albums/CDs (RPM)	70
German Albums (Offizielle Top 100)	42
New Zealand Albums (RMNZ)	14
UK Albums (Official Charts)	85
US Billboard 200	20

Chart (1997)	Peak position
Billboard 200	51

== Subsequent releases ==
=== Release history ===
Title	U.S. release date	Label	Format
Star Wars: Return of the Jedi (The Original Motion Picture Soundtrack)	1983	RSO	LP
Star Wars: Return of the Jedi (The Original Motion Picture Soundtrack)	1986	Polydor	CD
Star Wars Trilogy: The Original Soundtrack Anthology	1993	Arista	CD
The Star Wars Trilogy: Return of the Jedi (The Original Motion Picture Soundtrack)	1997	RCA Victor	Double CD
Star Wars Episode VI: Return of the Jedi (Original Motion Picture Soundtrack)	2004	Sony Classical	Double CD
The Music of Star Wars: 30th Anniversary Collector's Edition	November 6, 2007	Sony Classical	CD
Star Wars: The Ultimate Soundtrack Collection	January 8, 2016	Sony Classical	CD, LP, digital
Star Wars: Return of the Jedi (Original Motion Picture Soundtrack)	May 4, 2018	Walt Disney	Remastered CD, digital

=== Star Wars Trilogy: The Original Soundtrack Anthology ===
Star Wars Trilogy – The Original Soundtrack Anthology: "Return of the Jedi"
- Cover print of the third disc of 1993 release

Film score by John Williams and the London Symphony Orchestra
- Released: 1993
- Recorded: 1983
- Genre: Classical
- Labels: Arista Records on behalf of Twentieth Century Fox Film Scores, a Bertelsmann Music Group Company
- Producer: Nick Redman

In 1993, 20th Century Fox Film Scores released a four-CD box set containing music from the original Star Wars trilogy. This release marked the first time that the complete contents of the original double-LP releases of the scores from the first two films became available on CD. Disc three in the set was devoted to Return of the Jedi, with further tracks on disc four.

1. "20th Century Fox Fanfare with CinemaScope Extension" – 0:23
2. "Main Title/Approaching the Death Star" – 5:22
3. "Han Solo Returns (At the Court of Jabba the Hutt)" – 4:08
4. "Fight in the Dungeon" – 3:41
5. "The Return of the Jedi" – 5:02
6. "The Emperor Arrives" – 2:07
7. "The Death of Yoda" – 6:05
8. "Parade of the Ewoks" – 3:27
9. "Luke and Leia" – 4:47
10. "The Emperor Confronts Luke" – 3:29
11. "Into the Trap" – 2:39
12. "First Ewok Battle/Fight With the Fighters" – 7:24
13. "The Forest Battle" – 4:04
14. "The Final Duel/Into the Death Star" – 3:40
15. "The Emperor's Death" – 2:44
16. "Darth Vader's Death" – 2:33
17. "Through the Flames" – 1:39
18. "Leia Breaks the News/Funeral Pyre for a Jedi" – 2:22
19. "Ewok Celebration/Finale" – 7:58

Bonus Tracks (disc four of the same set)

3. "Heroic Ewok/The Fleet Goes Into Hyperspace"
7. "The Ewok Battle"
11. "Lapti Nek"
13. "Faking the Code"
14. "Brother and Sister"
16. "Leia is Wounded/Luke and Vader Duel"
19. "The Return of the Jedi (Alternate)"
20. "Leia Breaks the News (Alternate)/Funeral Pyre for a Jedi (Film Version)"
21. "Ewok Celebration (Film Version) /End Credits (Film Version)"
  - The second part of track twenty-one, "End Credits (Film Version)," is from The Empire Strikes Back.

=== 1997 Special Edition ===
Star Wars Episode VI: Return of the Jedi (Original Motion Picture Soundtrack)

Film score by John Williams
- Released: September 20, 2004
- Recorded: January–February 1983 and November 1997 (Special Edition)
- Genre: Classical
- Length: 2:28:04
- Label: Sony Classical
- Producers: John Williams, Nick Redman

Professional ratings
Review scores
Source	Rating
AllMusic	5/5 stars
iTunes	4.5/5 stars

In commemoration for the franchise's 20th anniversary in 1997, RCA Victor released 2-disc limited edition soundtracks for each film in the original trilogy. The release got a title The Star Wars Trilogy: Special Edition. For Return of the Jedi only, two newly recorded music tracks were added at George Lucas's request. John Williams wrote and recorded a new ending melody with the London Symphony Orchestra titled "Victory Celebration", replacing "Ewok Celebration" from the original release. Jerry Hey composed and arranged "Jedi Rocks" as a replacement for "Lapti Nek".

Sony Classical Records re-issued the soundtrack on September 21, 2004 under the title Star Wars Episode VI: Return of the Jedi (Original Motion Picture Soundtrack). The 2-disc set was advertised as the complete score despite missing several musical cues and original tracks.

Disc one
No.	Title	Length
1.	"20th Century Fox Fanfare" (Alfred Newman, 1954)	0:22
2.	"Main Title/Approaching the Death Star/Tatooine Rendezvous"	9:17
3.	"The Droids Are Captured"	1:21
4.	"Bounty for a Wookiee"	2:50
5.	"Han Solo Returns"	4:01
6.	"Luke Confronts Jabba/Den of the Rancor/Sarlacc Sentence"	8:51
7.	"The Pit of Carkoon/Sail Barge Assault"	6:02
8.	"The Emperor Arrives/The Death of Yoda/Obi-Wan's Revelation"	10:58
9.	"Alliance Assembly"	2:10
10.	"Shuttle Tydirium Approaches Endor"	4:09
11.	"Speeder Bike Chase/Land of the Ewoks"	9:38
12.	"The Levitation/Threepio's Bedtime Story"	2:46
13.	"Jabba's Baroque Recital"	3:09
14.	"Jedi Rocks"	2:42
15.	"Archival Bonus Track: Sail Barge Assault (Alternate)"	5:04

Disc two
No.	Title	Length
1.	"Parade of the Ewoks"	3:28
2.	"Luke and Leia"	4:46
3.	"Brother and Sister/Father and Son/The Fleet Enters Hyperspace/Heroic Ewok"	10:40
4.	"Emperor's Throne Room"	3:26
5.	"The Battle of Endor I": "Into the Trap" (2:30); "Forest Ambush" (2:00); "Scout Walker Scramble" (2:04); "Prime Weapon Fires" (5:16)"	11:50
6.	"The Lightsaber/The Ewok Battle"	4:31
7.	"The Battle of Endor II": "Leia is Wounded" (1:02); "The Duel Begins" (1:51); "Overtaking the Bunker" (1:00); "The Dark Side Beckons" (3:33); "The Emperor's Death" (2:37)"	10:03
8.	"The Battle of Endor III": "Superstructure Chase" (1:53); "Darth Vader's Death" (2:34); "The Main Reactor" (1:36)"	6:04
9.	"Leia's News/Light of the Force"	3:24
10.	"Victory Celebration/End Title"	8:34
11.	"Ewok Feast/Part of the Tribe"	4:02
12.	"Archival Bonus Track: The Forest Battle (Concert Suite)"	4:05

Although released as the complete score, there are several cues not on the Special Edition that have been released on previous releases. These include:

- "Lapti Nek" (Album) – This is released on the anthology set and is replaced on the SE with "Jedi Rocks".
- "Leia's News" (Alternate) – This is released on the anthology set. The film version however is heard on the SE.
- "Ewok Celebration" (Ewok Source) – This is released on the anthology set but is replaced on the SE with the new celebration music written for the SE.
- "Ewok Celebration" (Choir Source) – This is released on the anthology set and is an alternate vocal mix (using only the choir, not the Ewok voices).

== Unreleased cues ==
Currently, several source cues and other material are unavailable. Filmtracks lists music from the film that is not contained on the 1997, 2004, 2007, 2016, 2018 or 2025 albums, and reports that the Max Rebo Band music and an unused source cue were left off because they could not be found. These tracks include:

1. "Jabba the Hutt's Concert Suite" – About 1:20 of this original recording was tracked into the cue "Han Solo Returns" on the 1986 album and the 1993 Anthology; the full recording has not been included on later albums. (This same portion is heard on the Return of the Jedi DVD menu as well).
2. Unused Source Cue – A 90-second-long piece of source music not used in the film, described as sounding like "elevator synth music". It was originally meant to play either at some point after "Jabba's Baroque Recital" or possibly instead of it.
3. Film Version of "Lapti Nek" (Original Source) – Several versions of this source cue written by John Williams' son Joseph are available. Currently available are the album version on the Anthology and an extended album version and an instrumental track released on an LP single. However, the film version has yet to be released.
4. "Fancy Man" (English Version of "Lapti Nek" sung by Joseph Williams) – This cue can be heard partially in From Star Wars to Jedi: The Making of a Saga, but remains either lost or simply unreleased. Williams later released a version of the song as "Urth", with him singing both Huttese and English lyrics – as well as parts of the "Ewok Celebration", which he also wrote.
5. "Max Rebo Source" – Source Cue – This piece, performed by the resident musicians in Jabba's court (The Max Rebo Band) has never been released. It is heard after Chewbacca is taken away. This cue can also be heard almost totally complete in From Star Wars to Jedi: The Making of a Saga, but remains unreleased.
6. "Jabba Sail Barge Source" – Source Cue – A continuation of "Max Rebo Source" with slight alterations and different instrumentation (primarily played on synthesizers) that is heard on Jabba's sail barge.
7. Alternate Film Takes – Several cues such as "Superstructure Chase" are presented on the SE using incorrect and often flubbed takes.
8. "Battle for Endor Insert" – This insert can be heard in the film when Chewbacca and the Ewoks use the AT-ST to blow up another AT-ST and is similar to a section from "The Forest Battle Concert Suite" but has never been released.
9. "Ewok Celebration" (Film Version) – Two versions of this cue have been released, however, neither preserves the actual original recording used in the film.
10. "Freedom" – Original English demo version of "Ewok Celebration".
