= Pascal Le Boeuf =

American pianist and composer (born 1986)

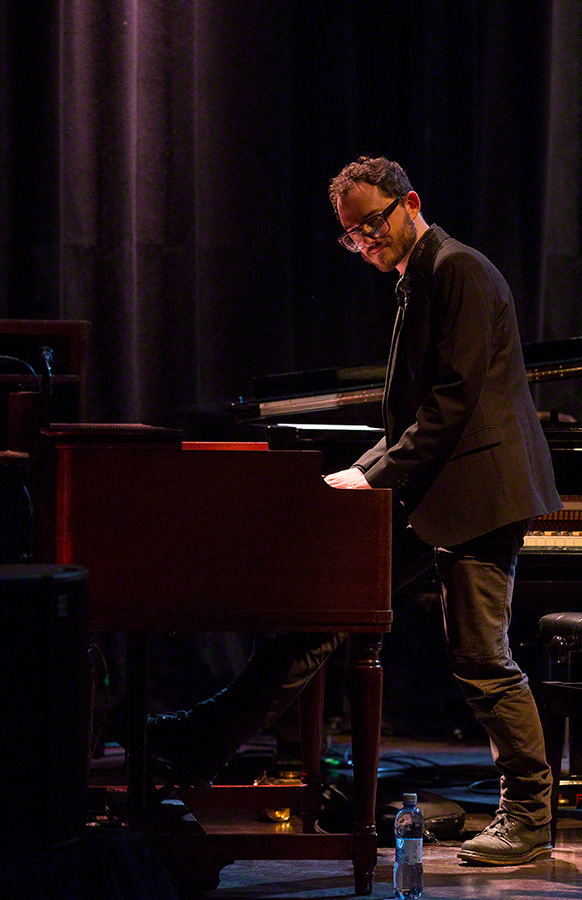

Background information
- Born: August 3, 1986 (age 39); Santa Cruz, California, U.S.
- Genres: Jazz, contemporary classical music, electronic
- Occupations: Composer, pianist, producer, musician, professor
- Instruments: Piano, keyboards, vocals
- Years active: 2000–present
- Labels: New Amsterdam Records; New Focus Records; Nineteen-Eight Records; Ropeadope Records; SoundSpore Records; Bright Shiny Things
- Awards: GRAMMY Award (2025); Guggenheim Fellowship (2023)
- Website: www.pascalmusic.com

Pascal Le Boeuf (born August 3, 1986) is an American pianist, composer and producer whose works, both solo and with others, range from modern improvised music to cross-breeding classical with production-based technology.

Le Boeuf won a Grammy Award for Best Instrumental Composition in 2025 for "Strands" (from Are We Dreaming the Same Dream? by Akropolis Reed Quintet, Pascal Le Boeuf, and Christian Euman). He had been nominated for the same award twice before, for the works "Alkaline" (2018) and “Snapshots” (2023).

Since 2000, he has co-led the jazz group Le Boeuf Brothers with his identical twin brother Remy Le Boeuf.

== Career ==
Le Boeuf was born in Santa Cruz, California. He is a 2004 YoungArts alumnus. He studied jazz piano at the Manhattan School of Music with Kenny Barron (Bachelors in Music in 2007 and Masters in Music in 2010) and music composition at Princeton University with Steve Mackey, Dmitri Tymoczko, Rudresh Mahanthappa, Donnacha Dennehy, and Louis Andriessen.

In 2004, Pascal and his twin brother Remy formed Le Boeuf Brothers and together released four albums, mixing jazz, hip hop, electronic and classical styles.

Le Boeuf's solo career includes Pascal's Triangle, the album recorded as a piano trio with bassist Linda May Han Oh and drummer Justin Brown, and he composed music for the 2008 Emmy Award-winning movie King Lines. He played as support for D’Angelo’s Second Coming US tour and the British electronic group Clean Bandit with Australian pop vocalist Meg Mac.

Since 2015, Le Boeuf's work has focused on collaborations with artists including Bec Plexus and Ian Chang, Alarm Will Sound, Iarla Ŏ Lionáird, Hub New Music and Four/Ten Media, Shattered Glass, Nick Photinos, Sara Caswell, Jessica Meyer and Todd Reynolds.

In 2025, Le Boeuf joined the faculty of the Massachusetts Institute of Technology as Assistant Professor of Music where he currently teaches composition. Previously, he served as an Assistant Professor of the Practice of Music and Technology at Vanderbilt University’s Blair School of Music from 2021-2025.

== Accolades ==
Le Boeuf won first place in the 2008 International Songwriting Competition. He has won multiple Independent Music Awards in Jazz, Eclectic, Electronica, and Music Video categories.

Le Boeuf received a FROMM Commission from Harvard University in 2015, the 2015 ASCAP Foundation Johnny Mandel Prize, and 2011 and 2015 New Jazz Works Commissions from Chamber Music America in collaboration with JACK Quartet and Le Boeuf Brothers.

In 2017, Le Boeuf was nominated for a Grammy Award for Best Instrumental Composition for his work "Alkaline" from the album Imaginist recorded by the Le Boeuf Brothers and the JACK Quartet. He was also nominated for his work “Snapshots” in the same category in 2023.

He holds a Ph.D. in Music Composition from Princeton University, in 2025 where he was the recipient of a Harold W. Dodds Honorific Fellowship. His dissertation "Metric Irregularity For The Creative Musician" explores how irregular rhythmic structures function across metric levels, how they are perceived and interpreted by performers, and how they can be used expressively and creatively in contemporary musical practice.

== Discography ==
=== Leader, featured artist ===
| Year | Title | Label | Role | Personnel |
|---|---|---|---|---|
| 2024 | Are We Dreaming the Same Dream? | Bright Shiny Things | composer, pianist, producer | Akropolis Reed Quintet, Pascal Le Boeuf, Christian Euman: featuring Tim Gocklin (oboe), Kari Landry (clarinet), Matt Landry (alto saxophone), Andrew Koeppe (bass clarinet), Ryan Reynolds (bassoon), Pascal Le Boeuf (piano), Christian Euman (drums) |
| 2023 | Ritual Being | SoundSpore Records | composer, pianist, producer | Pascal Le Boeuf: featuring Friction Quartet, Shattered Glass, Remy Le Boeuf (alto saxophone), Ben Wendel (tenor saxophone), Pascal Le Boeuf (piano), Linda May Han Oh (bass), Justin Brown (drums), Todd Reynolds (violin), Sara Caswell (violin), Jessica Meyer (viola), Nick Photinos (cello), Kelli Kathman (flute), Charles Yang (violin) |
| 2023 | HUSH | SoundSpore Records | composer, pianist, producer | Le Boeuf Brothers: featuring Remy Le Boeuf (alto saxophone), Dayna Stephens (tenor saxophone), Pascal Le Boeuf (piano), Linda May Han Oh (bass), Christian Euman (drums) |
| 2016 | Imaginist | New Focus Recordings | composer, pianist, producer | Le Boeuf Brothers + JACK Quartet: featuring Remy Le Boeuf (alto sax, oboe, bass clarinet), Ben Wendel (tenor sax), Ben Street/Martin Nevin (bass), Justin Brown/Peter Kronreif (drums) with Ari Streisfeld (violin), Christopher Otto (violin), John Pickford Richards (viola), Kevin McFarland (cello) |
| 2016 | Kissy Girls | Playground Mafia Records | songwriter, keyboardist, electronic production and sound design, producer | Kissy Girls: featuring Emily Greene (vocals/keyboard) |
| 2014 | Jesus On the Mainline EP | Converse Rubber Tracks | keyboardist | Jesus On the Mainline |
| 2014 | King Pony | Le Boeuf Brothers Music | songwriter, vocalist, keyboardist, producer | King Pony: featuring Leon Boykins (bass), Jake Goldbas (drums), Adam Levy, Billy Norris, Armand Hirsch (guitars) |
| 2013 | Pascal’s Triangle | Nineteen-Eight Records | composer, pianist, producer | Pascal Le Boeuf: featuring Linda Oh (bass), Justin Brown (drums) |
| 2013 | Remixed | Nineteen-Eight Records | composer, pianist, electronic production and sound design, producer | Le Boeuf Brothers: featuring remixes by Pascal and Remy Le Boeuf, Dave Binney, Tim Lefebvre, Wolff Parkinson White (Jochen Rueckert) Kissy Girls, Lucky Luke, Armand Hirsch |
| 2011 | In Praise of Shadows | Nineteen-Eight Records | composer, pianist, electronic production and sound design, producer | Le Boeuf Brothers: featuring Remy Le Boeuf (alto sax, bass clarinet, tenor sax), Mike Ruby (tenor sax), Linda Oh (bass), Henry Cole (drums), Nir Felder (guitar), Adria Le Boeuf (vocals), and Myth String Quartet: Tallie Brunfelt (violin), Jeremy Blanden (violin), Kim Uwate (viola), Isaac Melamed (cello) |
| 2009 | House Without A Door | Le Boeuf Brothers Music | composer, pianist/keyboardist, producer | Le Boeuf Brothers: featuring Remy Le Boeuf (alto sax, woodwinds), Ambrose Akinmusire (trumpet), Marcus Strickland (tenor sax, soprano sax), Matt Brewer (bass) Clarence Penn (drums), Janelle Reichman (tenor sax), Billy Norris (bass), Greg Ritchie (drums) |

=== Collaborator ===
- Tasha Warren & Dave Eggar, “Snapshots”, Ourself Behind Ourself, Concealed (Bright Shiny Things, 2022) – composer, pianist, editor
- Real Loud, “Forbidden Subjects”, Real Loud (New Focus Recordings, 2021) – composer, producer
- Bec Plexus + JACK Quartet and Ian Chang, “mirror image”, StickLip (New Amsterdam Records, 2020) – composer, producer, keyboardist
- Barbora Kolářová, “Imp in Impulse”, Imp in Impulse (Furious Artisans, 2020) – composer, producer
- Hub New Music, “Media Control”, July 3, 2020: A Benefit Compilation (New Amsterdam Records, 2020) – composer, producer
- Wolff Parkinson White, Favours (Nonplace, 2020) – vocalist, composer
- Joy On Fire, Hymn (Procrastination Records, 2020) – pianist
- Dmitri Tymoczko, Fools for Angels (New Focus Recordings, 2019) – pianist
- Remy Le Boeuf, Light as a Word (Outside in Music, 2019) – co-producer
- A New Age for New Age, “Our Kingdom”, New Age for a New Age Vol. 1 (NA4NA, 2019) – composer, producer, keyboardist
- Owen Lake and The Tragic Loves, The Best of Your Lies (Carrier Records, 2018) – keyboardist
- Nick Photinos (featuring JACK Quartet, Charles Yang, and Jeffrey Zeigler), “Alpha”, Petits Artѐfacts (New Amsterdam Records, 2017) – composer, producer
- Shattered Glass, “Transition Behavior”, Shattered Glass (Shattered Glass, 2017) – composer
- Jesus on the Mainline, The Morning Bell (Ropeadope Records, 2017) – keyboardist
- Empty Promise, Empty Promise – Single (Empty Promise, 2017) – co-composer, co-producer
- Ian Rosenbaum, Memory Palace (National Sawdust Tracks, 2017) – co-producer
- Allan Harris, Nobody’s Gonna Love You Better (Love Productions Records/Membran Entertainment, 2016) – pianist, keyboardist, arranger, songwriter
- RighteousGIRLS, Gathering Blue (New Focus Recordings, 2015) - composer, producer
- Allan Harris, Black Bar Jukebox (Love Productions/Must Have Jazz, 2015) - pianist, keyboardist, arranger
- ROMY, Unbound (Romy Balvers, 2014) - co-producer, keyboardist, backup vocalist
- Natalie Cressman & Secret Garden, Unfolding (Cressman Music, 2012) – pianist
- Michael Thomas, The Long Way (Michael Thomas, 2010) – pianist
- Murray-James Morrison, Happy Every Day (Murray-James Morrison, 2010) – pianist
- Bastien Weinhold, River Styx (FrameMusic, 2010) – pianist
- Mike Ruby, Play Time (Alma/Universal Music, 2007) – pianist, keyboardist
- Glass Eye Trio, Harajuku (Glass Eye Trio, 2007) – pianist, keyboardist
- Colin Stranahan, Transformation (Capri Records, 2006) – pianist, composer

=== Film and TV ===
| Year | Artist | Title | Studio/Publisher | Genre | Role |
|---|---|---|---|---|---|
| 2018 | Pascal Le Boeuf with Dave Eggar (cello), Jessica Meyer (viola), Gina Izzo (flute), and Four/Ten Media | Into the Anthropocene | Pascal Le Boeuf Music | Video EP | composer, producer |
| 2018 | Josephine Decker (director), Molly Herron (composer) | Madeline's Madeline (film), "The Kamaur" (composition) | Parris Pictures | Film music | producer |
| 2011 | David Schwartz | The Playboy Club | NBC | TV | pianist |
| 2008 | Ken Koenig | Santa Cruz Swings: A history of Jazz in Santa Cruz | Roseking Productions | Documentary DVD | pianist, composer |
| 2008 | Josh Lowell, Peter Mortimer | King Lines | Big Up Productions | Film soundtrack | keyboardist, electronic production and sound design, composer |
| 2000 | Jubilee 2000, Vatican Rome | Bernstein’s Mass | Kultur Films | Film score | soprano soloist |

== Filmography ==
| Year | Title | Role | Notes |
|---|---|---|---|
| 1999 | Dr. Seuss Toddler | Goslings | |
| 2005 | Virtua Quest | Hayami, Tito | English version |
