= The Adventures of Tintin (soundtrack) =

Music from the Motion Picture: The Adventures of Tintin : The Secret of the Unicorn

Film score by John Williams
- Released: 21 October 2011
- Genre: Soundtrack
- Length: 1:05:26
- Label: Sony Classical
- Producer: John Williams

John Williams chronology
| Indiana Jones and the Kingdom of the Crystal Skull (2008) | Music from the Motion Picture: The Adventures of Tintin : The Secret of the Unicorn (2011) | War Horse (2011) |

Music from the Motion Picture: The Adventures of Tintin: The Secret of the Unicorn is the soundtrack for the 2011 animated action/adventure film The Adventures of Tintin directed and produced by Steven Spielberg, based on Belgian cartoonist Hergé's comic book series The Adventures of Tintin. The film score is composed and conducted by John Williams, which is the first time he had composed and conducted the score of a film since Indiana Jones and the Kingdom of the Crystal Skull (2008) as well as his first score for an animated film. The score was released on 21 October 2011 by Sony Classical Records. Williams received a nomination for Best Original Score at the 84th Academy Awards for his work in the film.

== Production ==
Most of the score was written while the animation was still in the early stages, with Williams seeking to employ "the old Disney technique of doing music first and have the animators trying to follow what the music is doing". Eventually, several cues had to be revised during the editing of the film, when the editor Michael Kahn shown the rough cut. The composer decided to employ various musical styles, with "1920s–30s European jazz" for the opening credits and "pirate music" for the battle at sea.

Track 13, "Presenting Biance Castafiore," quotes the introductory bars from The Barber of Seville, specifically the aria "Una voce poco fa." and then leads into "Je veux vivre" from Roméo et Juliette.

== Track list ==
All music is composed by John Williams.

Music from the Motion Picture: The Adventures of Tintin: The Secret of the Unicorn track listing
| No. | Title | Length |
|---|---|---|
| 1. | "The Adventures of Tintin" | 3:04 |
| 2. | "Snowy's Theme" | 2:10 |
| 3. | "The Secret of the Scrolls" | 3:13 |
| 4. | "Introducing the Thompsons and Snowy's Chase" | 4:08 |
| 5. | "Marlinspike Hall" | 3:59 |
| 6. | "Escape from the Karaboudjan" | 3:21 |
| 7. | "Sir Francis and the Unicorn" | 5:05 |
| 8. | "Captain Haddock Takes the Oars" | 2:07 |
| 9. | "Red Rackham's Curse and the Treasure" | 6:10 |
| 10. | "Capturing Mr. Silk" | 2:58 |
| 11. | "The Flight to Bagghar" | 3:33 |
| 12. | "The Milanese Nightingale" | 1:20 |
| 13. | "Presenting Bianca Castafiore" | 3:28 |
| 14. | "The Pursuit of the Falcon" | 5:43 |
| 15. | "The Captain's Counsel" | 2:10 |
| 16. | "The Clash of the Cranes" | 3:48 |
| 17. | "The Return to Marlinspike Hall and Finale" | 5:51 |
| 18. | "The Adventure Continues" | 2:58 |
| Total length: | | 65:26 |

== Accolades ==
| Award | Category | Recipients and nominees | Result |
|---|---|---|---|
| Academy Awards | Best Original Score | John Williams | Nominated |
| Annie Award | Best Music in a Feature | John Williams | Won |
| BMI Film & TV Awards | Film Music Award | John Williams | Won |
| Grammy Awards | Best Score Soundtrack For Visual Media | John Williams | Nominated |
| Houston Film Critics Society | Best Original Score | John Williams | Nominated |
| Saturn Awards | Best Music | John Williams | Nominated |
| World Soundtrack Academy | Best Original Soundtrack of the Year | John Williams | Nominated |
| World Soundtrack Academy | Soundtrack Composer of the Year | John Williams | Nominated |

== Reception ==
Professional ratings
Review scores
| Source | Rating |
|---|---|
| AllMusic | 3.5/5 stars |
| Empire | 5/5 stars |
| Film Score Reviews | 3.5/5 stars |
| Filmtracks | 5/5 stars |
| Limelight | 3.5/5 stars |
| Movie Wave | 4/5 stars |
| Soundtrack Geek | 8.33/10 |
| Static Mass Emporium | 4/5 stars |

James Christopher Monger of Allmusic stated that: "Williams does not exaggerate the effects for comic purposes as he does, for example, in his Indiana Jones scores. Rather, this is ear candy for a movie that is equally sweet." Author Brad Kamminga wrote: "John Williams score for The Adventures of Tintin lacks the glorious and splendorous themes that defined many of Williams famous scores. Aside from that The Adventures of Tintin is an excellent score. John Williams, in his old age, proves once again that he has not lost his touch and remains to be a truly unrivaled composer [...] If you are a huge fan of John Williams and his complex works, this is definitely a score you need to purchase, but if you only enjoy the brilliant main theme songs Williams has composed in the past, don't expect to hear them in this score."

Filmtracks.com wrote: "if there is no substitute for John Williams' intellectual superiority over his peers, for even when approaching 80 years old, his comedic adventure techniques dazzle you with complexities of structure and instrumentation not heard elsewhere". Writing for the Limelight, Francis Merson summarised the review as "John Williams takes on a cartoon legend". Soundtrack Geek-based Jorn Tilnes wrote "John Williams is well and truly back ladies and gentlemen and you can really hear it in the score how terrific a composer he is. It's so full of energy, adventure and action and is perhaps only let down by a slight inconsistency. It doesn't sound like vintage John Williams from start to finish, but there are a lot of fun to be had and although the themes aren't as good as Williams absolute best, they represents Tintin well and some of them are easily remembered.

In the review for Static Mass Emporium, Phil Blanckley summarised: "The rhythmic flow of the score keeps you gripped throughout, and although it may not tug at the heartstrings as much as Williams' previous compositions, it does what it is intended to do – create the feeling of adventure. At times, it does seem like a never-ending frenzy of a musical mayhem, but it his John williams' at his best."
