= Indiana Jones and the Temple of Doom (soundtrack) =

Indiana Jones and the Temple of Doom: The Original Motion Picture Soundtrack

Film score by John Williams
- Released: 1984
- Studios: Sony Scoring Stage, Culver City
- Genre: Film score
- Length: 40:13, 75:26
- Label: Polydor
- Producers: John Williams; Bruce Botnick

John Williams chronology
Return of the Jedi (1983)	Indiana Jones and the Temple of Doom: The Original Motion Picture Soundtrack (1984)	The River (1984)

Indiana Jones chronology
Raiders of the Lost Ark (1981)	Indiana Jones and the Temple of Doom (1984)	Indiana Jones and the Last Crusade (1989)

Indiana Jones and the Temple of Doom: Original Motion Picture Soundtrack is the film score to the 1984 Steven Spielberg film, Indiana Jones and the Temple of Doom. The music was composed and conducted by John Williams and performed by the Hollywood Studio Symphony, with orchestrations provided by Herbert W. Spencer and Alexander Courage and first released on CD, LP, and cassette in 1984 and reissued on CD in 2008.

Numerous cues from the film were missing from the soundtrack's initial LP issue due to the inherent length limitations of a single LP (approximately forty minutes). After the release of an extended Raiders of the Lost Ark soundtrack album in 1995, there was some hope of a more complete release of the Temple of Doom score. This was eventually realized in November 2008 by the Concord Music Group as part of a five-CD boxed set that also included the soundtracks for Raiders of the Lost Ark, Indiana Jones and the Last Crusade and Indiana Jones and the Kingdom of the Crystal Skull.

== Reception ==
Writing for AllMusic, critic Jason Ankeny described the score as darker and more violent than its predecessor, influenced by elements of occultism and black magic. He praised its action sequences as "genuinely exciting", featuring "breakneck melodies and hairpin rhythms that build to death-defying climaxes". He also praised the score's vitality, arguing that Williams resisted recycling material from the previous film and instead imbued his themes with a vibrant, infectious energy.

Writing for Filmtracks, Christian Clemmensen praised the score for expanding the musical identity of the franchise while remaining faithful to the symphonic style and principal themes of Raiders of the Lost Ark. He highlighted the introduction of several new themes, particularly the driving march associated with the Temple and the enslaved children, which he described as combining martial snare drum rhythms with clanging metallic percussion and woodwind passages that evoke Eastern musical traditions. Clemmensen characterised the score as a "powerful symphonic romp of suspense and adventure", concluding that it was an underrated work and arguably superior to Indiana Jones and the Last Crusade.

In a review for Music from the Movies, James Southall regarded the score as one of John Williams' most distinctive works, highlighting its blend of relentless action, thematic richness and darker tone while remaining firmly anchored by the Raiders March. He also praised the score's "Temple of Doom" theme as a chilling choral chant that culminates in a frenzied climax during the film's sacrifice scene, noting that its use as diegetic music strengthens the relationship between music and imagery. Southall highlighted cues such as "Slave Children's Crusade" and "The Mine Car Chase", describing the former as one of Williams' finest themes and the latter as an energetic action piece. Southall concluded that, despite its demanding intensity, the score deserved wider recognition alongside the other films in the Indiana Jones series.

Professional ratings
Review scores
Source	Rating
AllMusic	4/5 stars
Filmtracks	5/5 stars
Movie Wave	4.5/5 stars

== Track listing ==
1984 Polydor Album
No.	Title	Note(s)	Length
1.	"Anything Goes"	Written by Cole Porter; arranged by John Williams; sung in Mandarin by Kate Capshaw	2:49
2.	"Fast Streets of Shanghai"		3:38
3.	"Nocturnal Activities"		5:53
4.	"Short Round's Theme"		2:27
5.	"Children in Chains"		2:42
6.	"Slalom on Mt. Humol"		2:22
7.	"The Temple of Doom"		2:57
8.	"Bug Tunnel and Death Trap"		3:29
9.	"Slave Children's Crusade"		3:22
10.	"The Mine Car Chase"		3:38
11.	"Finale and End Credits"		6:16
Total length:			39:33

== Subsequent releases ==
=== The Indiana Jones Trilogy ===
Silva released a new version of Williams' Indiana Jones music entitled "The Indiana Jones Trilogy" on January 21, 2003. It features various cues from the entire trilogy, with five from The Temple of Doom. However, although they use the original manuscripts, this is a re-recording performed by the City of Prague Philharmonic Orchestra. Helen Hobson provides both the Cantonese and English lyrics for "Anything Goes" in these recordings.

No.	Title	Note(s)	Length
8.	"Anything Goes"	Written by Cole Porter; arranged by John Williams; sung in Mandarin by Helen Hobson	2:58
9.	"Nocturnal Activities"		2:01
10.	"The Mine Car Chase"		3:32
11.	"Finale & End Credits"		6:30
16.	"Anything Goes"	Written by Cole Porter; arranged by John Williams; sung in English by Helen Hobson	3:04
Total length:			18:05

=== Indiana Jones: The Soundtracks Collection ===
The soundtrack to Temple of Doom was re-released on CD in November 2008 with expanded and remastered versions of Raiders of the Lost Ark and The Last Crusade. The set includes material never before issued from the original albums.

=== 2008 Concord Set ===
Disc Two
No.	Title	Note(s)	Length
1.	"Anything Goes"	Written by Cole Porter; arranged by John Williams; sung in Mandarin by Kate Capshaw	2:51
2.	"Indy Negotiates"	Previously Unreleased	3:59
3.	"The Nightclub Brawl"	Previously Unreleased	2:32
4.	"Fast Streets of Shanghai (Contains Raiders March)"		3:39
5.	"Map/Out of Fuel (Contains Raiders March)"	Previously Unreleased	3:22
6.	"Slalom on Mt. Humol (Contains Raiders March)"		2:24
7.	"Short Round's Theme"		2:28
8.	"The Scroll / To Pankot Palace"	Previously Unreleased	4:26
9.	"Nocturnal Activities (Contains Raiders March)"		5:54
10.	"Bug Tunnel / Death Trap (Contains Raiders March)"		3:30
11.	"Approaching the Stones"	Previously Unreleased	2:39
12.	"Children in Chains"		2:42
13.	"The Temple of Doom"		2:58
14.	"Short Round Escapes"	Previously Unreleased	2:22
15.	"Saving Willie (Contains Raiders March)"	Previously Unreleased	3:35
16.	"Slave Children's Crusade"		3:23
17.	"Short Round Helps (Contains Raiders March)"	Previously Unreleased	4:49
18.	"The Mine Car Chase (Contains Raiders March)"		3:41
19.	"Water!"	Previously Unreleased	1:55
20.	"The Sword Trick (Contains Raiders March)"	Previously Unreleased	1:05
21.	"The Broken Bridge / British Relief (Contains Raiders March)"	Previously Unreleased	4:47
22.	"End Credits (Contains Raiders March)"		6:19
Total length:			75:22

Disc Five
No.	Title	Note(s)	Length
4.	"Indy and the Villagers"	Previously Unreleased	3:54
5.	"The Secret Passage"	Previously Unreleased	3:31
12.	"Return to the Village / Raiders March"	Previously Unreleased	3:27
Total length:			10:52

=== Indiana Jones: The Complete Collection Box Set ===
The soundtrack was reissued by Walt Disney Records and released alongside the other four film soundtrack albums from the series in a collective 5-CD box set on March 27, 2024.

== Missing music ==
Several cues from Temple of Doom have yet to be released.

1. "Anything Goes Playoff"
2. "A Tribute to Vernon"
3. "Once in a Vial (Dance Orchestra)"
4. "The Indian Village"
5. "The Old Priest's Tale"
6. "The Child Returns"
7. "To Pankot Palace" (the version presented on the Concord set is not the film version)
8. "Entrance of the Boy King"
9. "Palace Source"
10. "The First Supper"
11. "Exchange of Glances"
12. "Moloram's Speech"
13. "The Evil Potion"
14. "Willy in the Fryer"
15. "The Rope Bridge"
16. "End Credits" (the version presented in all sets is an abridged version combining the opening of "Return to the Village/Raiders March" with the majority of this cue)
