= War Horse (soundtrack) =

War Horse (Original Motion Picture Soundtrack)

Film score by John Williams
- Released: 21 December 2011
- Recorded: 2011
- Genre: Soundtrack
- Length: 1:05:25
- Label: Sony Classical
- Producer: John Williams

John Williams chronology
The Adventures of Tintin (2011)	War Horse (2011)	Lincoln (2012)

War Horse (Original Motion Picture Soundtrack) is the score album to the 2011 film of the same name directed by Steven Spielberg. Spielberg's norm collaborator John Williams composed and conducted the score for the film, the second score composed the same year by Williams for Spielberg after The Adventures of Tintin. The score featured a 90-piece orchestra performing the orchestral music and was recorded during March and April 2011. It was released on 21 December 2011 by Sony Classical Records, four days prior to the film's release. The soundtrack was also released in German in February 2012, to accompany with the dubbed release of Gefährten in Germany.

The soundtrack received positive response from critics, and Williams received nomination for Best Original Score category at the 84th Academy Awards (also for Spielberg's The Adventures of Tintin), but lost to French composer Ludovic Bource for his score for The Artist (2011). It also received nominations for Original Score at Golden Globe, BAFTA and Satellite Award, which was also lost to The Artist.

== Development ==
Williams took inspiration by visiting a horse farm in California and observing horses and their behavior, elaborating that "I got in the habit of watching the horses in the morning, and I began to see how they connect to each other and how they became curious about me. That's when I really began to get the sense that horses are very special creatures. They have been magnificent and trusted friends for such a long time and have done so much for us with such grace."

Williams was also influenced by the geographic scope of the film's story. In regard to that approach, Williams stated:

"This was a very rich opportunity musically because it is both about humans and animals and it takes place in three different countries. It starts out in a more intimate way, on the farm with the bonding of Joey and Albert. Then, the eruption of war changes the scale, and the music does a 180-degree turn. From this bucolic, gentle, even sentimental music, you move into the music of battle surges and gripping struggles. It's a musical journey full of dimension and emotional content, and I tried also to create an atmosphere reflective of that period, which was lyrical, poetic and tragic."

The score was recorded in late March and early April 2011, by a 90-piece orchestra, with Williams comparing the recording sessions more to a concert piece rather than a traditional film score, as it relied more on the individual performance of the musicians. Tuba player Jim Self reported in May 2011, saying that he had recorded the score segment, which involved a "lot of brass—but it was gentle music often." English folk singer John Tams, who wrote the songs for the stage production of War Horse, was approached by Spielberg and Williams about including one of his songs from the stageshow in the film. The score was mixed and designed by Gary Rydstrom.

In the liner notes to the film soundtrack's CD, Spielberg wrote, "I feel that John has made a special gift to me of this music, which was inspired not only by my film but also by many of the picturesque settings of the poet William Wordsworth, whose vivid descriptions of the British landscape inspired much of what you are going to hear." In the premiere of three of the tracks on New York radio station WQXR's "Movies on the Radio", broadcaster David Garland drew parallels with the work of British composer Ralph Vaughan Williams. Several unreleased scores were featured in the For Your Consideration album in order to be nominated for major awards season.

== Track listing ==
All music is composed by John Williams.

No.	Title	Length
1.	"Dartmoor, 1912"	3:35
2.	"The Auction"	3:34
3.	"To Giant Country"	4:42
4.	"Bringing Joey Home and Bonding"	3:20
5.	"Seeding and Horse vs. Car"	3:33
6.	"Plowing"	5:10
7.	"Ruined Crop and Going to War"	3:29
8.	"The Charge and Capture"	3:21
9.	"The Desertion"	2:33
10.	"Joey's New Friends"	3:30
11.	"Pulling the Cannon"	4:11
12.	"The Death of Topthorn"	2:45
13.	"No Man's Land"	4:35
14.	"The Reunion"	3:55
15.	"Remembering Emilie and Finale"	5:07
16.	"The Homecoming"	8:06
Total length:		65:26

== Reception ==
Writing for AllMusic, William Ruhlmann said "This is certainly not one of Williams' light adventure scores à la Star Wars or Raiders of the Lost Ark, nor horror music such as Jaws. Rather, it contains both homey and disturbing parts, within the overall context of an old-fashioned orchestral movie soundtrack." Nathan Cone of Texas Public Radio said "The early cues are pastoral, and evocative of the Dartmoor countryside. The music is ripe with Celtic influences, and a friend of mine even picked out a quote from an old Irish sea chantey. There are few big themes established, but the mood is set as a young boy takes in a steed named Joey. Midway through the album, the mood turns more somber, as Joey is placed into service."

James Southall of Movie Wave wrote "the score on the album plays out along a very well-developed dramatic path – listening to the album really is like hearing a story told through music – is testament to his [Williams'] great gifts". Mfiles-based Sean Wilson wrote "It's the orchestral nuances; it's the memorability of the themes themselves (regardless of whether they get stand-alone arrangements); it's the complex tapestry of emotions that take the listener on an emotional journey. Even in his advancing years, Williams refuses to rest on his laurels, always pushing himself to come up with stunning music that matches Spielberg's vision." Jonathan Broxton of Movie Music UK wrote "Williams’ work in [War Horse] is to be amongst the best of the year. He provides Joey – who is, obviously, incapable of conveying human emotion – with a voice and a heart, and allows the film to tell the story of his life with scope, grandeur and an epic sweep, but which is also not afraid to convey a sense of intimacy when required. It also shows Williams to be a master dramatist, expertly pushing the audience's buttons in all the right places with a score that is beautiful to the ear, intellectually stimulating to the brain through its thematic complexity and narrative flow, and stirring to the soul."

The Guardian's Andrew Puliver and The Prague Reporter's Jason Pirodsky called the score as "persistently soaring" and "swells up on the soundtrack". Classic FM.com wrote "War Horse is a mix of pastoral folky numbers and full-on orchestral blow-outs as the films moves from the English countryside to wartime France." Filmtracks.com wrote "being a Williams score, this music relies on the intelligence of its constructs to succeed, and in that regard, the composer continues to prove that he is at the top of his game. Rather than worry about the difficultly he faced when being forced to abandon all of his many themes halfway through the picture, enjoy each portion of War Horse for its inherent saturation with Williams' trademark sensibilities."

== Accolades ==
Awards	Category	Name	Result	Ref.
Academy Awards	Best Original Score	John Williams	Nominated	
Academy Awards	Best Sound Editing	Richard Hymns; Gary Rydstrom	Nominated	
Academy Awards	Best Sound Mixing	Gary Rydstrom; Andy Nelson; Tom Johnson; Stuart Wilson	Nominated	
British Academy Film Awards	Best Film Music	John Williams	Nominated	
British Academy Film Awards	Best Sound	Stuart Wilson; Gary Rydstrom; Andy Nelson; Tom Johnson; Richard Hymns	Nominated	
BMI Film & TV Awards	Film Music Award	John Williams	Won	
Broadcast Film Critics Association Awards	Best Sound	War Horse	Nominated	
Broadcast Film Critics Association Awards	Best Score	John Williams	Nominated	
Golden Globe Awards	Best Original Score	John Williams	Nominated	
Houston Film Critics Society Awards	Best Score	John Williams	Nominated	
Motion Picture Sound Editors Golden Reel Awards	Best Sound Editing: Sound Effects and Foley in a Feature Film	War Horse	Won	
Motion Picture Sound Editors Golden Reel Awards	Best Sound Editing: Dialogue and ADR in a Feature Film	War Horse	Nominated	
Satellite Awards	Best Original Score	John Williams	Nominated	
Satellite Awards	Best Sound (Editing & Mixing)	Andy Nelson; Gary Rydstrom; Richard Hymns; Stuart Wilson; Tom Johnson	Nominated	
Washington D.C. Area Film Critics Association	Best Score	John Williams	Nominated	
