= Le Boeuf Brothers =

American jazz group led by twin brothers

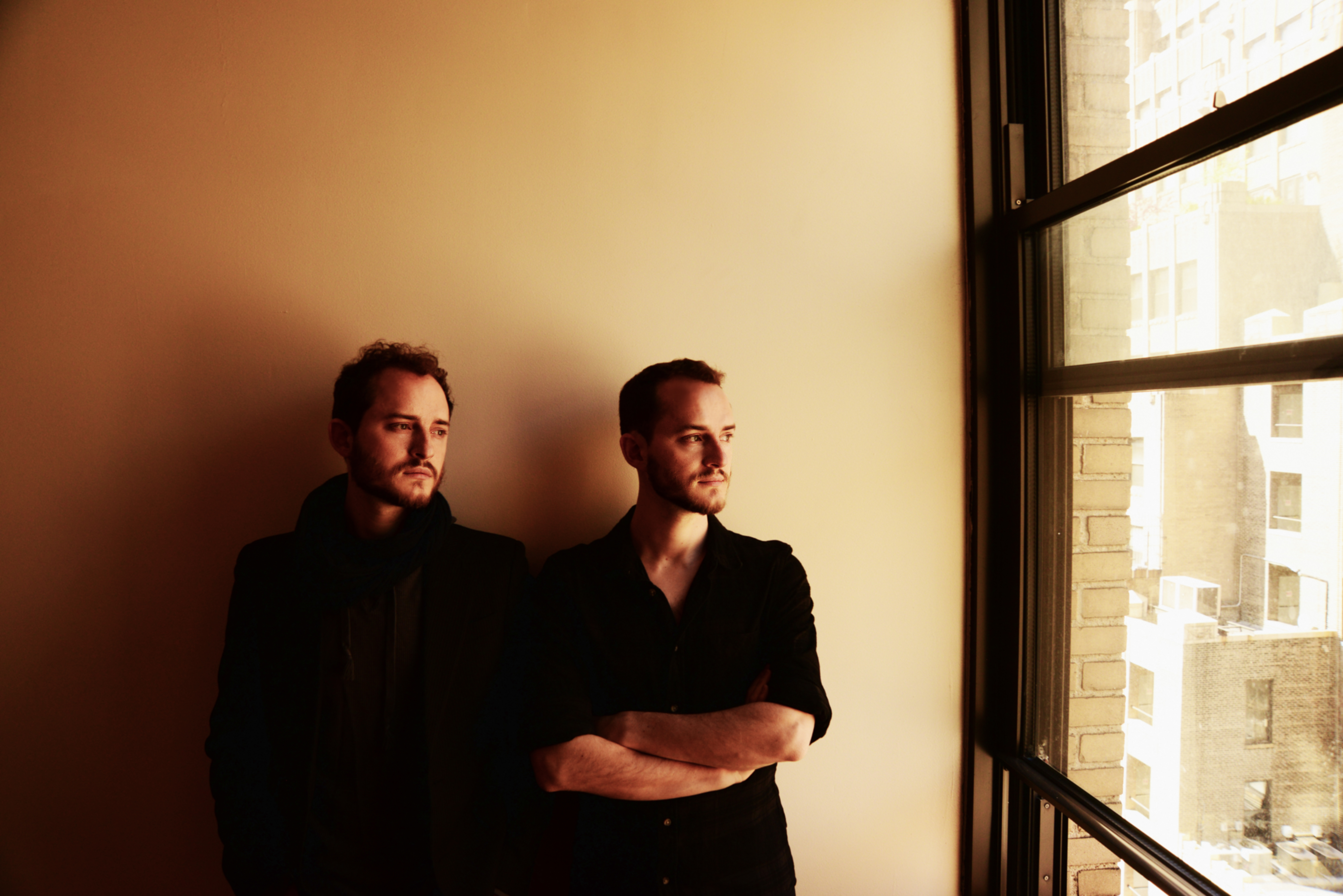

Background information
- Genres: jazz
- Years active: 2000-present
- Labels: Le Boeuf Brothers Music; Nineteen-Eight Records; New Focus Recordings; Panoramic Recordings
- Members: Remy Le Boeuf; Pascal Le Boeuf
- Website: www.leboeufbrothers.com

Le Boeuf Brothers is a modern jazz group based in New York City led by identical twin brothers, Remy Le Boeuf (saxophonist/composer) and Pascal Le Boeuf (pianist/composer). The brothers were born on August 3, 1986, in Santa Cruz, California. Le Boeuf Brothers are part of a growing New York jazz scene characterized by odd time signatures, shifting harmonies, and the influences of hip hop, electronica, and indie rock. As a jazz group, they have released five albums: their first in 2009 and latest in 2023.

Pascal's solo career includes Pascal's Triangle, the album recorded as a piano trio with bassist Linda Oh and drummer Justin Brown, and he composed music for the 2008 Emmy Award-winning movie King Lines. He played as support for D'Angelo's Second Coming US tour and the British electronic group Clean Bandit with Australian pop vocalist Meg Mac.

Remy is a big band composer, with commissions from SFJAZZ, The Jerome Foundation, New York Youth Symphony, and Keio University. He also performs as a sideman for various artists including Grammy Award-winning Bob Mintzer's Big Band, Dayna Stephens, indie-pop band Wildcat! Wildcat! and Donny McCaslin.

The Le Boeuf Brothers have also toured internationally and performed at the Monterey Jazz Festival, the Montreal Jazz Festival, the Kennedy Center, Carnegie Hall, the Umbria Jazz Festival, and Jazz at Lincoln Center.

The San Francisco Chronicle describes their music as "a rich brand of modern jazz, with performances and compositions that display an impressive level of sophistication. Textured harmonies and shifting time signatures are handled with aplomb."

== Early life and history ==
At the age of 12, Remy and Pascal began performing at local farmer's markets and on the main strip in downtown Santa Cruz. During their high school years, they performed with the SFJAZZ High School All-Star Ensemble as well as several national all-star ensembles including the Gibson-Baldwin Grammy High School Band, youngARTS, Next Generation Jazz Orchestra. When they turned 18 in 2004, they moved to New York to attend the Manhattan School of Music where they both received bachelor's and master's degrees in Jazz Performance. Throughout their high school and college years the brothers combined for 17 ASCAP Herb Alpert Young Jazz Composer Award and countless Downbeat Student Music Awards.

Before they even turned 18, the Le Boeuf Brothers were already appearing on bills with well-known jazz performers like Chick Corea and Chris Potter, John Benitez, The Heath Bros, Clark Terry, Gary Burton, The Clayton Bros, Jeff Hamilton, Ann Hampton Calloway, Phil Woods, Jon Faddis, Regina Carter, Kurt Elling, David "Fat Head" Newman, and Jay McShann. At the IAJE (International Association of Jazz Educators) performance in 2004 Le Boeuf Brothers performed live with Chris Potter.

== Career ==
=== 2009: House Without A Door ===
In May 2009, Le Boeuf Brothers released their first album, House Without a Door. The New York Times described it as an "impressively self-assured new album… which reaches for the gleaming cosmopolitanism of our present era." They were joined on this project by Ambrose Akinmusire (trumpet), Marcus Strickland (tenor saxophone), Janelle Reichman (tenor saxophone), Matt Brewer (bass), Billy Norris (bass), Greg Ritchie (drums), and Clarence Penn (drums).

Prior to that album's release, Pascal's song, "Code Word," won the duo 1st place in jazz category of the 2008 International Songwriting Competition.

Le Boeuf Brothers joined the lineup of the Monterey Jazz Festival in 2010, and that same year recorded a follow-up album.

=== 2011: In Praise of Shadows ===
For the recording of In Praise of Shadows, Remy and Pascal employed various production techniques including automated delays and reverb, sampling and remixing. The tasks were divided: Remy's classical composition knowledge allowed him to orchestrate the songs to include bass clarinet and a string quartet. Meanwhile, Pascal took care of the electronic production of the album. The enhanced CD invited listeners to manipulate the tracks on their own computers, making personalized remixes, with an option to submit these new versions to Le Boeuf Brothers' website.

In May 2012, the Music Resource Group (MRG) selected the duo as the winners in The 11th Independent Music Awards (IMAs).

=== 2013: Remixed ===
Two years after the release of In Praise of Shadows, Le Boeuf Brothers delivered an album called Remixed that not only made electronica remixes of most of that album's tracks, but included additional artists such as Kissy Girls, Dave Binney, Tim Lefebvre, and others as well.

In 2015, Remixed won Best Album in the Eclectic category of the 14th Annual Independent Music Awards. Additionally, Pascal's song, "What Your Teacher..." won Best Song in the Jazz Instrumental category.

=== 2016: Imaginist ===
The Le Boeuf Brothers' fourth album, Imaginist (released October 14, 2016) is a collaboration with the New York-based JACK Quartet, which features Grammy Award-winning tenor saxophonist Ben Wendel, alternating bassists Ben Street and Martin Nevin, and alternating drummers Justin Brown and Peter Kronreif. Based on the 20th-century Russian poetry movement "imaginism," the album is structured like a book including a prologue, plot and epilogue. The album includes Remy's Chamber Music America New Jazz Works commission, "A Dream: The Musical Imagination of Franz Kafka," a mix of music and narration about a man named Joseph K. who dreams he stumbles upon someone carving his name on a tombstone. "A Dream" had an East and West Coast live premier: At Bryant Park in New York in July 2012, and at the Kuumbwa Jazz Center in Santa Cruz later in the year.

The New York Times wrote: "Their impressive new album, imaginist, is a collaboration with the JACK Quartet, and it goes further than most such efforts to tackle the idea of "chamber-jazz" without holding back on either side."

== Discography ==
Year	Artist	Title	Genre	Label
2009	Le Boeuf Brothers	House Without a Door	Jazz	Le Boeuf Brothers Music
2011	Le Boeuf Brothers	In Praise of Shadows	Jazz	Nineteen Eight Records
2013	Le Boeuf Brothers	Remixed	Jazz, electronic	Nineteen Eight Records / Le Boeuf Brothers Music
2016	Le Boeuf Brothers + JACK Quartet	imaginist	Jazz, contemporary classical	New Focus Recordings / Panoramic Recordings
2023	Le Boeuf Brothers	HUSH	Jazz	SoundSpore Records
2026	Le Boeuf Brothers	Off Center	Jazz, contemporary classical, indie-rock	SoundSpore Records
