= Indiana Jones and the Kingdom of the Crystal Skull (soundtrack) =

Film score by John Williams
- Released: May 20, 2008
- Recorded: February–March 2008
- Studio: Sony Pictures Studios
- Length: 74:17
- Label: Concord
- Producer: John Williams

John Williams chronology
Munich (2005)	Indiana Jones and the Kingdom of the Crystal Skull (2008)	The Adventures of Tintin (2011)

Indiana Jones chronology
The Last Crusade (1989)	Kingdom of the Crystal Skull (2008)	The Dial of Destiny (2023)

Indiana Jones and the Kingdom of the Crystal Skull (Original Motion Picture Soundtrack) is the film score to the 2008 film of the same name, composed and conducted by John Williams and performed by the Hollywood Studio Symphony, with orchestrations provided by Conrad Pope and Eddie Karam. The soundtrack album was released by Concord Records on May 20, 2008.

== Track listing ==
All music is composed by John Williams.

No.	Title	Length
1.	"Raiders March"	5:05
2.	"Call of the Crystal"	3:49
3.	"The Adventures of Mutt"	3:12
4.	"Irina's Theme"	2:26
5.	"The Snake Pit"	3:15
6.	"The Spell of the Skull"	4:24
7.	"The Journey to Akator"	3:07
8.	"A Whirl Through Academe"	3:33
9.	""Return""	3:11
10.	"The Jungle Chase"	4:21
11.	"Orellana's Cradle"	4:22
12.	"Grave Robbers"	2:28
13.	"Hidden Treasure and the City of Gold"	5:13
14.	"Secret Doors and Scorpions"	2:17
15.	"Oxley's Dilemma"	4:46
16.	"Ants!"	4:14
17.	"Temple Ruins and the Secret Revealed"	5:49
18.	"The Departure"	2:26
19.	"Finale"	9:19
Total length:		74:17

Like most of John Williams' soundtracks, the tracks are not listed in the order they appear in the film. To listen to the soundtrack in chronological order would go 6, 8, 7, 12, 14, 11, 9, 5, 10, 16, 15, 13, 17, 18, and 19 along with 1 - 4 as bonus tracks heard in concert theme.

The soundtrack debuted on the Billboard 200 at number 39 during its first week.

=== Indiana Jones: The Complete Collection Box Set ===
The soundtrack was reissued by Walt Disney Records and released alongside the other four film soundtrack albums from the series in a collective 5-CD box set on March 27, 2024.

== Personnel ==
Professional ratings
Review scores
Source	Rating
AllMusic	3.5/5 stars
Empire	4/5 stars
Film Music Magazine	B+
Film Score Reviews	4/5 stars
Filmtracks	4/5 stars
Movie Music UK	4/5 stars
Movie Wave	4.5/5 stars
ScoreNotes	8/10 stars
SoundtrackNet	4/5 stars
Tracksounds	7/10 stars

- John Williams – producer
- Ramiro Belgardt – music editor
- Shawn Murphy – recording, mixing engineer
- Sandy de Crescent – music contractor
- Peter Rotter – music contractor
- Hollywood Film Chorale – choir
- Sally Stevens – vocal contractor
- Jo Ann Kane Music Service – music preparation
- Patricia Sullivan Fourstar – mastering
- Andrew Pham – package design
