= The Empire Strikes Back (soundtrack) =

Soundtrack

Star Wars: The Empire Strikes Back (Original Motion Picture Soundtrack)
- Cover of the original vinyl edition

Soundtrack album by John Williams
- Released: May 16, 1980
- Recorded: December 1979–January 1980
- Studios: Anvil Studios, Denham
- Genre: Classical
- Length: 74:34
- Label: RSO
- Producers: John Williams, Nick Redman (2004)

John Williams chronology
1941 (1979)	Star Wars: The Empire Strikes Back (Original Motion Picture Soundtrack) (1980)	Raiders of the Lost Ark (1981)

The score from The Empire Strikes Back was composed and conducted by John Williams. Between Star Wars and The Empire Strikes Back, Williams had also worked with the London Symphony Orchestra for the scores to the films The Fury, Superman and Dracula. The score earned another Academy Award nomination for Williams. Again, the score was orchestrated by Herbert W. Spencer and Angela Morley, recorded by engineer Eric Tomlinson and edited by Kenneth Wannberg with supervision by Lionel Newman. John Williams himself took over duties as record producer from Star Wars creator George Lucas.

The soundtrack was first released in the United States as a 75-minute double LP five days before the film's premiere but the first Compact Disc release ran only half the length of the 2-LP set. Re-recordings of the score even included music that was not on the original CD soundtrack. A remastered version of the soundtrack was released by Walt Disney Records on May 4, 2018.

== Background ==
The musical score of The Empire Strikes Back was composed and conducted by John Williams, and performed by the London Symphony Orchestra at a cost of about $250,000. Williams began planning in November 1979, estimating Empire required 107 minutes of score. For two weeks across eighteen three-hour sessions just after Christmas, Williams recorded the score at Anvil Studios and EMI Studios, London. Up to 104 players were involved at any one time, performing with instruments including oboes, piccolos, pianos, and harps.

== History ==
In 1980, the disco label RSO Records released the film's original soundtrack in a double-album, with two long-playing (LP) records. Combined, the two records featured seventy-five minutes of film music. This double LP package also included a booklet presentation with pictures of the main characters and action sequences from the film. Featured at the booklet's end was an interview with John Williams about the music and the new themes, such as "The Imperial March (Darth Vader's Theme)" and "Yoda's Theme". It also included a brief explanation of each track. The front cover artwork featured Darth Vader's mask against the backdrop of outer space; and the back cover featured the famous Gone with the Wind version of the poster art. As a side note, this package marked the final time a double LP soundtrack set was ever issued (Episode VI, the final film to have an LP soundtrack released, had only a single disc, also released by RSO Records). A double-cassette edition was also released.

In the U.K., a single vinyl album and cassette were released in 1980 by RSO Records. This comprised only ten tracks, which were also re-arranged differently. For instance, the first track on the U.K. release is "The Imperial March" instead of the "Star Wars Main Theme". This track listing would be used for the album's first international CD release in 1985. Also unlike the U.S. version, this release did not have a booklet but the information (and some photographs) were replicated on the inner sleeve.

In 1985, the first Compact Disc (CD) release of the soundtrack was issued by Polydor Records, which had by that time absorbed RSO Records and its entire music catalog. As with the album's original U.K. vinyl and cassette release, this CD release reduced the music content from the seventy-five minutes featured in the 1980 U.S. double-album down to forty-two minutes.

In 1993, 20th Century Fox Film Scores released a special four-CD box set: Star Wars Trilogy: The Original Soundtrack Anthology. This anthology included the soundtracks to all three of the original Star Wars films in separate discs. The disc dedicated to The Empire Strikes Back restored almost all of the original seventy-five minutes from the 1980 LP version and included new music cues never released before for a total of nineteen tracks. On the fourth bonus disc, five additional tracks from Empire were included in a compilation of additional cues from the other two films. This CD release also marked the first time that the famous "20th Century Fox Fanfare" composed by Alfred Newman in 1954 was added to the track listing, preceding the "Star Wars Main Theme".

In 1997, RCA Victor released a definitive two-disc set coinciding with the Special Edition releases of the original trilogy's films. This original limited-edition set featured a thirty-two page black booklet that was encased inside a protective outer slipcase. The covers of the booklet and the slipcase had the Star Wars Trilogy Special Edition poster art. This booklet was very detailed, providing extensive notes on each music cue and pictures of the main characters and action sequences from the film. The two discs were placed in sleeves that were on the booklet's inside front and inside back covers. Each disc had a glittery laser-etched holographic logo of the Empire. The musical content featured the complete film score for the first time. It had all of the previously released tracks (restoring the Mynock Cave music which was left off the 1993 release), included extended versions of five of those tracks with previously unreleased material, and six brand new tracks of never before released music for a total of one hundred twenty-four minutes. All the tracks were digitally remastered for superior clarity of sound. They were also re-arranged and re-titled from the previous releases to follow the film's story in chronological order. RCA Victor re-packaged the Special Edition set later in 1997, offering it in slimline jewel case packaging as an unlimited edition, but without the original "black booklet" version's stunning presentation and packaging.

In 2004, Sony Classical acquired the rights to the classic trilogy scores since it already had the rights to release the second trilogy soundtracks (The Phantom Menace and Attack of the Clones). In 2004, Sony Classical re-pressed the 1997 RCA Victor release of the Special Edition Star Wars trilogy, including The Empire Strikes Back. The set was released in a less-than-spectacular package with the new art work mirroring the film's first DVD release. Despite the Sony digital remastering, which minimally improved the sound heard only on high-end stereos, this 2004 release is essentially the 1997 RCA Victor release.

In 2016, Sony Classical released a remastered version of the original 1980 release as a two-disc LP, copying all aspects of the original RSO release, down to the labeling.

On May 4, 2018, Walt Disney Records released a newly-remastered edition of the original 1980 album program on CD, digital download, and streaming services. This remaster was newly assembled from the highest-quality tapes available, rather than sourced from the existing 1980 album masters. This release marks the first release on CD of the complete 1980 soundtrack album.

=== Release history ===
Title	U.S. release date	Label	Format
The Empire Strikes Back–Original Soundtrack	May 16, 1980	RSO	Double-LP
The Empire Strikes Back–Original Soundtrack	1986	Polydor	CD
Star Wars Trilogy: The Original Soundtrack Anthology	1993	Arista	CD
Star Wars Episode V: The Empire Strikes Back (Original Motion Picture Soundtrack)	1997	RCA Victor	Double CD
Star Wars Episode V: The Empire Strikes Back (Original Motion Picture Soundtrack)	2004	Sony Classical	Double CD
The Music of Star Wars: 30th Anniversary Collector's Edition	November 6, 2007	Sony Classical	CD
Star Wars: The Ultimate Soundtrack Collection	January 8, 2016	Sony Classical	CD, LP, digital
Star Wars: The Empire Strikes Back (Original Motion Picture Soundtrack)	May 4, 2018	Walt Disney	Remastered CD, digital

== Track listing ==
=== First U.S. release on LP ===
- First release on LP by RSO.

Side one
No.	Title	Length
1.	"Star Wars (Main Theme)"	5:49
2.	"Yoda's Theme"	3:24
3.	"The Training of a Jedi Knight"	3:17
4.	"The Heroics of Luke and Han"	6:18

Side two
No.	Title	Length
5.	"The Imperial March (Darth Vader's Theme)"	2:59
6.	"Departure of Boba Fett"	3:30
7.	"Han Solo and the Princess"	3:25
8.	"Hyperspace"	4:02
9.	"The Battle in the Snow"	3:48

Side three
No.	Title	Length
10.	"The Asteroid Field"	4:10
11.	"The City in the Clouds"	6:29
12.	"Rebels at Bay"	5:23
13.	"Yoda and the Force"	4:01

Side four
No.	Title	Length
14.	"The Duel"	4:07
15.	"The Magic Tree"	3:32
16.	"Lando's Palace"	3:52
17.	"Finale"	6:28

Total Time: 74:34

==== Charts ====
Chart (1980)	Position
Australia (Kent Music Report)	58
Canada Top Albums/CDs (RPM)	15
New Zealand Albums (RMNZ)	15
US Billboard 200	4

Chart (2004)	Position
US Soundtrack Albums (Billboard)	24

Chart (2026)	Position
US Top Classical Albums (Billboard)	8
US Top Classical Crossover Albums (Billboard)	7

=== Original U.K. release and first international release on CD ===
- First release on CD by Polydor.
1. "The Imperial March (Darth Vader's Theme)" – 3:00
2. "Yoda's Theme" – 3:27
3. "The Asteroid Field" – 4:10
4. "Han Solo and the Princess" – 3:26
5. "Finale" – 6:25
6. "Star Wars (Main Theme)" – 5:48
7. "The Training of a Jedi Knight" – 3:05
8. "Yoda and the Force" – 4:02
9. "The Duel" – 4:03
10. "The Battle in the Snow" – 3:48

Total Time: 41:23

=== Star Wars Trilogy: The Original Soundtrack Anthology ===
Star Wars Trilogy – The Original Soundtrack Anthology: "The Empire Strikes Back"

Film score by John Williams and the London Symphony Orchestra
- Released: 1993
- Recorded: 1980
- Genre: Classical
- Labels: Arista Records on behalf of Twentieth Century Fox Film Scores, a Bertelsmann Music Group Company
- Producer: Nick Redman

In 1993, 20th Century Fox Film Scores released a four-CD box set containing music from the original Star Wars trilogy. Disc two in the set was devoted to The Empire Strikes Back, with further tracks on disc four.

Disc Two
No.	Title	Length
1.	"20th Century Fox Fanfare with CinemaScope Extension (Alfred Newman, 1954)"	0:22
2.	"Main Title/The Imperial Probe (Extended Version)"	7:58
3.	"Luke's Escape"	3:34
4.	"Luke's Rescue"	1:45
5.	"The Imperial March (Darth Vader's Theme)"	2:59
6.	"The Battle in the Snow"	3:45
7.	"Luke's First Crash"	4:12
8.	"The Rebels Escape Again"	2:59
9.	"The Asteroid Field"	4:14
10.	"Yoda's Theme"	3:26
11.	"Han Solo and the Princess"	3:26
12.	"The Training of a Jedi Knight"	3:13
13.	"The Magic Tree"	3:32
14.	"Yoda and the Force"	4:02
15.	"City in the Clouds"	6:50
16.	"Lando's Palace"	3:52
17.	"The Duel"	4:14
18.	"Hyperspace"	4:03
19.	"Finale/End Credits"	6:18

Disc Four
No.	Title	Length
6.	"Drawing the Battle Lines/Leia's Instructions"	4:02
8.	"Attack Position"	3:04
9.	"Crash Landing"	3:34
17.	"Carbon Freeze/Luke Pursues the Captives/Departure of Boba Fett"	11:08
18.	"Losing a Hand"	1:14
21.	"Ewok Celebration (Film Version)/End Titles (Film Version)"

Note: Parts of tracks six and seventeen on this particular set have their left & right channels reversed).

The first part of track twenty-one, "Ewok Celebration (Film Version)", is from Return of the Jedi.

=== Special edition re-issue ===
In preparation for the 20th anniversary Special Edition releases of the original trilogy's films, 20th Century Fox spent four months, from April to July 1996, transferring, cleaning and preparing the original soundtracks for special two-disc releases. The original release, by RCA Victor in 1997, consisted of limited-edition books with laser etched CDs inside the front and back covers with each book. In the case of The Empire Strikes Back, the discs are etched with the logo for the Empire. The discs were given an unlimited release in a two-disc jewel case, also by RCA Victor later that year. They were again re-released in 2004 by Sony Music, with new artwork paralleling the original trilogy's first DVD release.

Disc One
No.	Title	Length
1.	"20th Century Fox Fanfare" (Alfred Newman (1954))	0:22
2.	"Main Title/The Ice Planet Hoth"	8:08
3.	"The Wampa's Lair/Vision of Obi-Wan/Snowspeeders Take Flight"	8:44
4.	"The Imperial Probe/Aboard the Executor"	4:24
5.	"The Battle of Hoth": I. "Ion Cannon"; II. "Imperial Walkers"; III. "Beneath the AT-AT"; IV. "Escape in the Millennium Falcon"	14:48 4:02 3:37 4:03 3:06
6.	"The Asteroid Field"	4:15
7.	"Arrival on Dagobah"	4:52
8.	"Luke's Nocturnal Visitor"	2:35
9.	"Han Solo and the Princess"	3:26
10.	"Jedi Master Revealed/Mynock Cave"	5:44
11.	"The Training of a Jedi Knight/The Magic Tree"	5:16
Total length:		62:41

Disc Two
No.	Title	Length
1.	"The Imperial March (Darth Vader's Theme)"	3:02
2.	"Yoda's Theme"	3:30
3.	"Attacking a Star Destroyer"	3:04
4.	"Yoda and the Force"	4:02
5.	"Imperial Starfleet Deployed/City in the Clouds"	6:04
6.	"Lando's Palace"	3:53
7.	"Betrayal at Bespin"	3:46
8.	"Deal with the Dark Lord"	2:37
9.	"Carbon Freeze/Darth Vader's Trap/Departure of Boba Fett"	11:50
10.	"The Clash of Lightsabers"	4:18
11.	"Rescue from Cloud City/Hyperspace"	9:10
12.	"The Rebel Fleet/End Title"	6:28
Total length:		61:42

== Recording information ==
=== Cue List ===
- R1P1 Main Title
- R1P2 The Imperial Probe
- R1P2 New Start
- R1P2 Insert Bar 80
- R1P2 Insert #2 Bar 109
- R1P3-R2P1 Luke's Escape
- R2P2 Ben's Instruction
- R2P3 Luke's Rescue
- R2P4 The Probe Scanner
- R3P1 Drawing the Battle Lines
- R3P2 Leia's Instructions
- R3P3 The Snow Battle
- R3P4-R4P1 Luke's First Crash
- R4P2 The Rebels Escape Again
- R4P3 The Asteroid Field
- R5P1 Crash Landing
- R5P2 Yoda Appears
- R5P3 Yoda's Entrance
- R5P3 End Fix
- R5P4-R6P1 Solo and the Princess
- R6P2 Yoda's Teaching
- R6P3 This is Not a Cave
- R6P4 Training a Jedi
- R6P5-R7P1 The Magic Tree
- R7P2 Attack Positions
- R7P3 Yoda Raises the Ship
- R7P4-R8P1 Vadar's Command
- R8P2 City in the Clouds
- R8P3 Lando's Palace
- R9P1 Luke to the Rescue
- R9P2 Vadar Shows Up
- R9P3 Putting ThreePio Together
- R9P4 Trouble in Prison
- R9P6-R10P1 Carbon Freeze
- R9P6-R10P1 Insert Bar 57
- R10P2 Luke Pursues the Captives
- R10P3 Chewie Chokes Lando
- R11P1 Through the Window
- R11P2-R12P1 Losing a Hand
- R12P2 To Hyper Space
- R12P3 Finale
- R12P4 End Credits
- R12P4 End Credits Insert
- The Imperial March (Darth Vader’s Theme)
- Yoda's Theme

== See also ==
- Music of Star Wars
- Empire Jazz

== Works cited ==
- Arnold, Alan (1980). Once Upon a Galaxy: A Journal of Making the Empire Strikes Back. London: Sphere Books. ISBN 978-0-345-29075-5.
- Rinzler, J. W. (2010). The Making of Star Wars: The Empire Strikes Back — The Definitive Story. United Kingdom: Aurum Press. ISBN 978-1-84513-555-3. OCLC 657407687.
