= Star Wars: In Concert =

Series of concerts

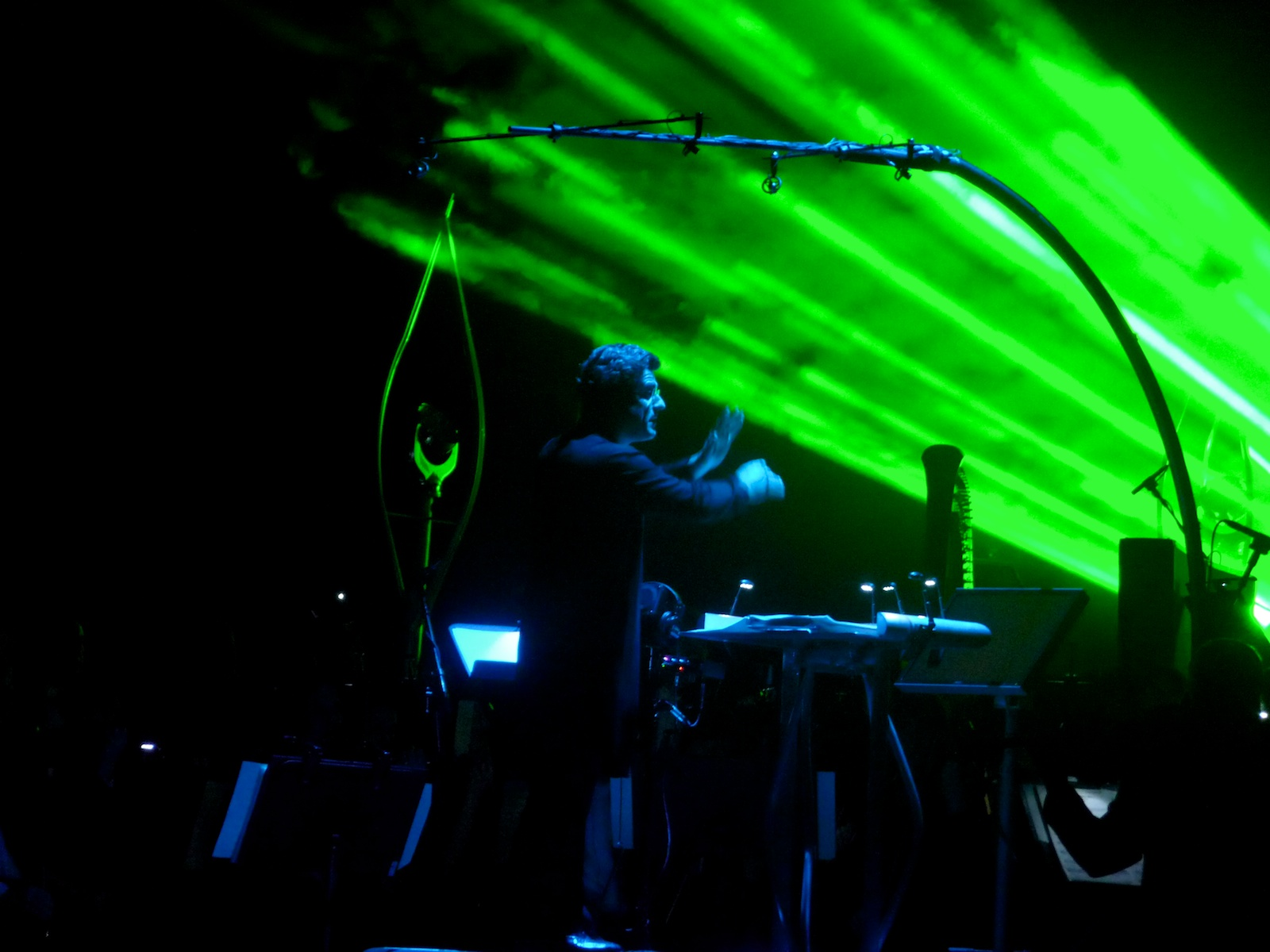
- Dirk Brossé conducts during the laser show.
- Associated album: Star Wars soundtracks
- Start date: October 1, 2009
- End date: 2015
- Legs: 2

Star Wars: In Concert, previously referred to as Star Wars: A Musical Journey, was a series of concerts featuring a symphony orchestra and choir, along with footage from the Star Wars saga films displayed on a large LED screen at three stories tall. The screen is set to live performances of the Star Wars score composed by John Williams. The first performance took place in The O2 Arena in London, England and was attended by approximately 20,000 fans. The first North American tour started in Anaheim, California on October 1, 2009, and the second and most recent North American tour ended in London, Ontario on April 14, 2015. The concert series was scheduled to return sometime in 2016, but has since been delayed indefinitely.

The concerts were narrated by Anthony Daniels, conducted by Dirk Brossé, and performed by the Royal Philharmonic Concert Orchestra. James Earl Jones provided his voice for Daniels' introduction. The concert uses selected compositions from the Star Wars saga starting with Star Wars: Episode I – The Phantom Menace and ending with Episode VI: Return of the Jedi with an intermission between the two trilogies. Although the musical selections are presented in order according to episode, the film clips do not correlate to the film the music is from, but correlate thematically.

The Star Wars concert series is scheduled to perform again internationally through 2026 and 2027, coinciding with the 50th anniversary of the franchise. The productions feature screenings of the feature films accompanied by live symphony orchestras performing the films musical scores. Notable programming include a four-day trilogy weekender scheduled at the Royal Albert Hall in London, featuring the London Symphony Orchestra, alongside concurrent tour dates managed by regional orchestras worldwide.

== Scenes ==
=== Set one ===
1. Opening: THX Deep Note, 20th Century Fox Fanfare, "Main Title/Blockade Runner"
2. Dark Forces Conspire: "Duel of the Fates"
3. A Hero Rises: "Anakin's Theme"
4. Droids!: "The Dune Sea of Tatooine/Jawa Sandcrawler"
5. A Race With Destiny: "The Flag Parade"
6. Forbidden Love: "Across the Stars"
7. A Hero Falls: "Battle of the Heroes"
8. An Empire is Forged: "The Imperial March"

=== Intermission ===
The first set is followed by a twenty-minute intermission. The second set is preceded by a laser-light show that is synchronized with "Clash of the Lightsabers".

=== Set two ===
1. A Narrow Escape: "Asteroid Field"
2. A Defender Emerges: "Leia's Theme"
3. An Unlikely Alliance: "Tales of a Jedi Knight"/"Cantina Band"
4. A Jedi Is Trained: "Yoda's Theme"
5. A Strike For Freedom: "TIE Fighter Attack"
6. A Bond Unbroken: "Luke and Leia"
7. Sanctuary Moon: "Forest Battle"
8. A Life Redeemed: "Light of the Force"
9. A New Day Dawns: "Throne Room/End Credits"

=== Encore ===
- "The Imperial March"

== Prop exhibit ==
- Costumes
  - Chewbacca suit from Episode IV, V and VI
  - Darth Vader's armor
  - Queen Amidala's Galactic Senate Gown (without cloak)
  - Naboo handmaiden gowns
  - Naboo security guard uniform
  - Chancellor Palpatine robe
  - C-3PO from Episode III
  - Plo Koon costume
  - Kit Fisto costume from Episode II
  - Senate Guard armor and robe
  - Emperor's Royal Guard armor and robe
  - Ewok costumes from Episode VI
- Props
  - Scout Trooper helmet from Episode VI
  - A-Wing Pilot helmet from Episode VI
  - Imperial gunner helmet from Episode IV
  - Han Solo in carbonite
- Artwork
  - Kashyyyk by Ralph McQuarrie for the Star Wars Holiday Special
  - Concept art of various Kashyyyk scenes
- Other
  - Sheet music for "The Droid Battle" for Episode I, written by John Williams
  - Many backdrops, including the Forest Moon of Endor, the Battle of Geonosis, Kashyyyk, the Death Star, Tatooine, and more.
