= Star Wars: Episode III – Revenge of the Sith (soundtrack) =

Star Wars: Episode III – Revenge of the Sith: Original Motion Picture Soundtrack

Film score by John Williams
- Released: May 3, 2005
- Recorded: February 2005
- Studios: Abbey Road Studios, London
- Genre: Classical
- Length: 71:53
- Label: Sony Classical
- Producer: John Williams

John Williams chronology
The Terminal (2004)	Star Wars: Episode III – Revenge of the Sith: Original Motion Picture Soundtrack (2005)	War of the Worlds (2005)

The original motion picture soundtrack for the 2005 film Star Wars: Episode III – Revenge of the Sith was released by Sony Classical on May 3, 2005, more than two weeks before the film's release. The music was composed and conducted by John Williams, and performed by the London Symphony Orchestra and London Voices in February 2005, with orchestrations provided by Conrad Pope and Eddie Karam. The score was Williams' sixth score in the saga. Shawn Murphy recorded the score. Ramiro Belgardt and Kenneth Wannberg served as music editors; Wannberg served as music editor for the previous Star Wars scores. A remastered version of the soundtrack was released by Walt Disney Records on May 4, 2018.

The album would be Williams' final Star Wars score to be recorded with the London Symphony Orchestra and as of 2025, the most recent score composed by Williams to be recorded outside of Hollywood with one exception in Lincoln, which was recorded in Chicago with the Chicago Symphony Orchestra.

A music video titled A Hero Falls was created for the film's theme, "Battle of the Heroes", featuring footage from the film. In the UK, "Battle of the Heroes" was released as a CD-single and reached No. 25 in the UK Singles Chart in June 2005.

The soundtrack also came with a collectors' DVD, Star Wars: A Musical Journey, that features 16 music videos set to remastered selections of music from all six film scores, set chronologically through the saga.

This album was chosen as one of Amazon.com's Top 100 Editor's Picks of 2005.

== Overview ==
The musical score for Star Wars: Episode III – Revenge of the Sith, the Star Wars saga's sixth installment, was recorded over fourteen days at Abbey Road Studio with the London Symphony Orchestra and London Voices starting on February 3, 2005, and ending on February 17, with one morning allocated specifically for vocal recording.

== "Battle of the Heroes" ==
"Battle of the Heroes" (2005)
A 21-second sample of "Battle of the Heroes". The track was used during the second half of Anakin's and Obi-Wan's duel on the planet Mustafar.

"Battle of the Heroes" is the theme for the climactic duel between Obi-Wan Kenobi and Anakin Skywalker (who has now become Darth Vader), written upon the request of George Lucas. Lucas wanted a piece that would function as a tragic version of "Duel of the Fates" in the film's final fight scenes.

The concert suite begins with a soft and tense ostinato by the violas in tremolo. Stopped horns join in to present an initial statement of the theme, immediately followed by pulsing beats with mezzopiano double basses and cellos. The ostinato builds as the harp and trombones make their entrance. Suddenly, the horns, 1st violins, and choir play the theme at a louder dynamic level. The ostinato still plays beneath it all. Twice, the theme is interrupted by brief flurries of chaotic "action music". At a key moment, the "Force Theme" makes a forceful entrance in a C minor key. After the piece's main theme is heard several more times, "Battle of the Heroes" culminates in a fortissimo tutti of repeated D minor chords. This false ending is followed by the viola ostinato again. Solo flute, oboe, English horn, clarinet, and horn in unison deliver a melancholic interpretation of the theme's third over the ostinato, which slowly dies away before landing on the tonic. The timpani rumble as the entire orchestra crescendos into a final D minor chord.

The theme is played during the climactic duel between Darth Vader and Obi-Wan Kenobi; during use, Darth Sidious and Yoda also duel. At the beginning of the battle, a cue titled "Heroes Collide" ("Anakin vs. Obi-Wan" on the original soundtrack) is heard. This cue juxtaposes fast-paced variations of "Battle of the Heroes" with the "Clash of Lightsabers" cue from The Empire Strikes Back. Later in the duel, fragments of the theme return twice in a cue titled "The Boys Continue". (This cue is not heard on the original soundtrack, although both of its "Battle of the Heroes" variations can be heard in various video games.) After "The Boys Continue" (and a short, quiet cue titled "Rev. Yoda to Exile"), a cue simply titled "Revenge of the Sith" plays as Vader and Obi-Wan exchange blows on a river of lava. This is basically a re-recording of the concert suite on the soundtrack album, but without the extended opening and ending. There are also a few minor differences in the orchestration, and the rhythm of the final tutti chords is different.

The music video A Hero Falls has been featured on DVD and StarWars.com. Set to "Battle of the Heroes", it contains video clips from Episode III (with dialogue and sound effects). The music video can be found on the Star Wars: A Musical Journey DVD, included with the Episode III soundtrack album, as well as on the Episode III – Revenge of the Sith DVD.

In the UK, the theme was put on general release as a CD single and reached No. 25 on the UK Singles Chart in June 2005.

== Reception ==
Professional ratings
Review scores
Source	Rating
AllMusic	4.5/5 stars
Common Sense Media	5/5 stars
Empire	5/5 stars
Filmtracks.com	4/5 stars
Movie Wave	4.5/5 stars
ScoreNotes	9/10 stars
Soundtrack.Net	4/5 stars

The musical score for Revenge of the Sith has received generally positive reviews. Rob Theakston of AllMusic said, "Revenge of the Sith holds a place on the mantle with some of the classic scores that made Williams a legendary film composer. It's also a fine closing masterpiece to a series of movies filled with some of the most important musical moments in modern cinematic history." Danny Graydon of Empire called it "a triumphant climax to a modern music masterpiece." Specifically pointing out "Battle of the Heroes" and "Anakin's Dark Deeds", Graydon said, "The operatic finale of this score emboldens the tragic, doom-laden atmosphere of the saga’s pivotal moment, yet is typically brisk and exciting, deftly utilising themes from the entire series."

Film music scholar Royal Brown was less enthusiastic about the music and its relation to the overall film series, saying, "By the time we get to Revenge of the Sith it's not as fresh as it was. Not because Williams is doing anything wrong, but because he's pretty much locked into a particular requirement for this particular kind of movie." Filmtracks.com provided a similar consensus in its editorial review describing that when "compared to its peers, Revenge of the Sith is, despite its great strengths in its individual cues of immense melodrama, the weakest of the six scores when compared amongst each other." Morag Reavley of BBC Music said that the soundtrack "strikes back with all the familiar notes. They just don't sound quite as startling any more."

== Track listing ==
All music is composed by John Williams.

No.	Title	Length
1.	"Star Wars and The Revenge of the Sith"	7:31
2.	"Anakin's Dream"	4:46
3.	"Battle of the Heroes"	3:42
4.	"Anakin's Betrayal"	4:04
5.	"General Grievous"	4:07
6.	"Palpatine's Teachings"	5:25
7.	"Grievous and the Droids"	3:28
8.	"Padmé's Ruminations"	3:17
9.	"Anakin vs. Obi-Wan"	3:57
10.	"Anakin's Dark Deeds"	4:05
11.	"Enter Lord Vader"	4:14
12.	"The Immolation Scene"	2:42
13.	"Grievous Speaks to Lord Sidious"	2:49
14.	"The Birth of the Twins and Padmé's Destiny"	3:37
15.	"A New Hope and End Credits"	13:06
Total length:		1:11:53

In the film they are played in the order: 1, 7, 13, 2, 6, 5, 8, 4, 11, 10, 9, 3, 12, 14, 15.

== Star Wars: A Musical Journey ==
Star Wars: A Musical Journey is a bonus DVD included with the soundtrack album. The DVD, which runs just over an hour long, contains a collection of music video clips from the Star Wars film series set to selected themes from Williams' scores. Each clip features an optional introduction by actor Ian McDiarmid, and the music has been remastered in Dolby 5.1 surround sound. This program served as the foundation for Star Wars: In Concert, almost containing an identical soundtrack.

Star Wars: A Musical Journey contains the following chapters. Each video consists of clips from the movies that seemingly fit the music score composed by Williams:

1. "A Long Time Ago" —
  "20th Century Fox Fanfare" / "Star Wars Main Title"
2. "Dark Forces Conspire" —
  "Duel of the Fates" (from The Phantom Menace)
3. "A Hero Rises" —
  "Anakin's Theme" (from The Phantom Menace)
4. "A Fateful Love" —
  "Across the Stars" (from Attack of the Clones)
5. "A Hero Falls" —
  "Battle of the Heroes" (from Revenge of the Sith)
6. "An Empire is Forged" —
  "The Imperial March" (from The Empire Strikes Back)
7. "A Planet that is Farthest From" —
  "The Dune Sea of Tatooine" / "Jawa Sandcrawler" (from A New Hope)
8. "An Unlikely Alliance" —
  "Binary Sunset" / "Cantina Theme" (from A New Hope)
9. "A Defender Emerges" —
  "Princess Leia's Theme" (from A New Hope)
10. "A Daring Rescue" —
  "Ben's Death" / "TIE Fighter Attack" (from A New Hope)
11. "A Jedi is Trained" —
  "Yoda's Theme" (from The Empire Strikes Back)
12. "A Narrow Escape" —
  "The Asteroid Field" (from The Empire Strikes Back)
13. "A Bond Unbroken" —
  "Luke and Leia" (from Return of the Jedi)
14. "A Sanctuary Moon" —
  "The Forest Battle (Concert Suite)" (from Return of the Jedi)
15. "A Life Redeemed" —
  "Light of the Force" (from Return of the Jedi)
16. "A New Day Dawns" —
  "Throne Room" / "Finale" (from A New Hope)

== Recording information ==
=== Cue list ===
- 1M1 Fox Fanfare (The Empire Strikes Back Recording)
- 1M2 Star Wars Main Theme (The Phantom Menace Recording)
- 1M3 Boys Into Battle (February 12, 2005)
- 1M4 They're Coming Around (February 14, 2005)
- 1M4A "Get 'Em, R-2!" (February 7, 2005)
- 1M5 The Elevator Scene (February 17, 2005)
- 1M6 Count Dooku's Entrance (February 14, 2005)
- 1M7 The Death of Dooku (February 2, 2005)
- 1M8 [UNKNOWN TITLE***] (Tracked)
- 2M1 Grievous and the Droids (February 9, 2005)
- 2M2 [Dive, Dive*] (Tracked)
- 2M3 Another Happy Landing (February 3, 2005)
- 2M4 Revisiting Padmé (February 3, 2005)
- 2M5 Grievous Travels to Palpatine (February 3, 2005)
- 2M6 Scenes and Dreams (February 12, 2005)
- 2M7 Be Careful of Your Friend (February 13, 2005)
- 3M1 Council Meeting (February 14, 2005)
- 3M2 Hold Me (February 13, 2005)
- 3M2A Palpatine's TV Set (February 7, 2005)
- 3M3 Palpatine's Big Pitch (February 9, 2005)
- 3M4 [Wookiees Attack*] (Tracked)
- 3M5 Goodbye Old Friend (February 3, 2005)
- 3M6 Going to Utapau (February 13, 2005)
- 3M7 Riding the Lizard (February 12, 2005)
- 3M8 Obi-Wan Faces Death (February 12, 2005)
- 4M1X Drawing Swords (February 3, 2005)
- 4M1A Good Guys Arrive (February 8, 2005)
- 4M2 [Council Roundtable*] (Tracked)
- 4M3 Palpatine's Seduction (February 2, 2005)
- 4M4 Rolling With Grievous (February 13, 2005)
- 4M4A Fighting With Grievous (February 8, 2005)
- 4M5 Dialogue With Mace (February 17, 2005)
- 4M5A Padmé's Ruminations (February 8, 2005)
- 4M6 I am the Senate (February 14, 2005)
- 5M1 Palpatine Instructs Anakin (February 3, 2005)
- 5M2 [Anakin March*] (Tracked)
- 5M3 Lament (February 7, 2005)
- 5M3A Bail's Escape (February 14, 2005)
- 5M4 "Swimming, Droids and Yoda Farewell" (February 9, 2005)
- 5M5 News of the Attack (February 12, 2005)
- 5M6 Moving Things Along (February 9, 2005)
- 5M7 Anakin's Dark Deeds (February 3, 2005)
- 6M1 It Can't Be (February 17, 2005)
- 6M2 A Moody Trip (February 12, 2005)
- 6M3 Padmé's Visit (February 2, 2005)
- 6M4 Heroes Collide (February 2, 2005)
- 6M5N [Duel of Yoda and Sidious**] (Not Assigned)
- 6M6 Yoda Falls (February 3, 2005)
- 6M7 The Boys Continue (February 8, 2005)
- 6M8R Yoda to Exile (February 12, 2005)
- 6M9 Revenge of the Sith (February 3, 2005)
- 7M1 The Immolation Scene (February 8, 2005)
- 7M2 Anakin Crawling (February 8, 2005)
- 7M3 The Birth of the Twins (February 7, 2005)
- 7M4 The Death of Padmé (February 7, 2005)
- 7M5 Plans for the Twins (February 8, 2005)
- 7M6 Padmé's Funeral (February 7, 2005)
- 7M7 A Home for the Twins (February 7, 2005)
- 7M8 End Credits (February 17, 2005)

*Title from GEMA Repertoire **Title from BMI ***BMI list once had an entry for this cue, but it is now missing.

== Charts ==
Chart performance for Star Wars: Episode III – Revenge of the Sith soundtrack
Chart (2005)	Peak position
Australian Albums (ARIA)	9
Austrian Albums (Ö3 Austria)	12
Belgian Albums (Ultratop Flanders)	18
Belgian Albums (Ultratop Wallonia)	31
Canadian Albums (Nielsen SoundScan)	13
Danish Albums (Hitlisten)	37
Dutch Albums (Album Top 100)	22
European Albums (Billboard)	7
Finnish Albums (Suomen virallinen lista)	26
French Albums (SNEP)	9
German Albums (Offizielle Top 100)	10
Hungarian Albums (MAHASZ)	8
Irish Albums (IRMA)	44
Italian Albums (FIMI)	16
Japanese Albums (Oricon)	5
Polish Albums (ZPAV)	14
Portuguese Albums (AFP)	25
Scottish Albums (Official Charts)	21
Singaporean International Albums (RIAS)	3
Spanish Albums (Promusicae)	1
Swedish Albums (Sverigetopplistan)	51
Swiss Albums (Schweizer Hitparade)	29
UK Albums (Official Charts)	16
UK Soundtrack Albums (Official Charts)	1
US Billboard 200	6
US Soundtrack Albums (Billboard)	1
US Top Classical Albums (Billboard)	1
US Top Classical Crossover Albums (Billboard)	1

== Certifications ==
Certifications for Star Wars: Episode III – Revenge of the Sith soundtrack
Region	Certification	Certified units/sales
United Kingdom (BPI)	Silver	60,000^{^}
^{^} Shipments figures based on certification alone.
