= Star Wars: Episode I – The Phantom Menace (soundtrack) =

Star Wars Episode I: The Phantom Menace – Original Motion Picture Soundtrack
- Cover from the original 1999 release

Film score by John Williams
- Released: May 4, 1999
- Recorded: February 1999
- Studios: Abbey Road Studios, London
- Genre: Classical
- Length: 74:23
- Label: Sony Classical
- Producer: John Williams

John Williams chronology
Stepmom (1998)	Star Wars Episode I: The Phantom Menace – Original Motion Picture Soundtrack (1999)	Angela's Ashes (1999)

Re-release cover
- Ultimate Edition re-release cover (2000)

Singles from Star Wars Episode I: The Phantom Menace (soundtrack)
- 1. "Duel of the Fates" Released: 1999

Star Wars Episode I: The Phantom Menace – Original Motion Picture Soundtrack is the film score to the 1999 film of the same name, composed and conducted by John Williams, and performed by the London Symphony Orchestra, London Voices and the New London Children's Choir with orchestrations provided by Conrad Pope and John Neufeld. The soundtrack album was released by Sony Classical Records on May 4, 1999, two weeks before the film's theatrical release. In anticipation of the long-awaited film, the soundtrack was certified Platinum in the United States where it debuted and peaked on the Billboard 200 at number 3, and certified Gold in the United Kingdom, where it entered the UK album charts at number eight.

Three formats were available, and a new one was released in May 2018:

- The original album released on compact disc, cassette, and Sony's MiniDisc to accompany the film (May 4, 1999). This release is a single disc containing 17 tracks from the score, and a cassette with 8 tracks from the film. Each track is edited by Williams to present the score as one would hear it in a concert suite.
- This album was also available on a two disc vinyl LP set through specialized retailers such as Star Wars Insider.
- The Two-Disc Ultimate Edition released by popular demand (November 14, 2000). This set presents the score predominately as heard in the film (with most of the edits, loops, tracked music, and post-production changes in place). Although not exactly what is heard in the film, this set was meant to be listened to as one would hear the score in the film, but is not the complete score (although it is falsely stated on the back of the set as being 'every note recorded.')
- A special re-issue of the original album to celebrate the film's 3D re-release on February 6, 2012. This version contains the "Duel of the Fates (Dialogue Version)" bonus track originally included on the Ultimate Edition.
- A remastered version of the soundtrack was released by Walt Disney Records on May 4, 2018.

None of the releases contain the entire score. Currently, no complete release has been made. The Album and Ultimate Edition each contain music not featured on the other release. Both sets also contain alternate takes of cues, while neither present some of the alternate takes only heard in the film.

== Overview ==
Recorded in Abbey Road Studios over a week, starting on February 10, 1999, performed by the London Voices and London Symphony Orchestra, Star Wars: Episode I – The Phantom Menace was the first Star Wars score Williams had composed in over 16 years. Williams produced the recording sessions himself with Shawn Murphy recording and mixing the score. Kenneth Wannberg returned as music editor, having fulfilled this task on the previous three Star Wars scores. Several source cues were also composed by Williams' son, Joseph.

The scores of the following two films would rely heavily upon tracking from this score, a decision that Williams and George Lucas had decided upon early into the film's production.

No complete score has ever been released, but the majority of unreleased pieces can be heard in various LucasArts video games.

After the album's release, the popularity of a more complete bootleg version of the score began to steal profits. In response, Sony released the Ultimate Edition, presenting the score nearly as it is heard in the film while falsely marketing itself as "every note ever recorded."

=== Track listing ===
The original release of the soundtrack only contained one disc. This is also the same track listing for Walt Disney Records' 2018 reissue.

As Williams had done on his earlier releases for Star Wars soundtracks, the score is arranged with a greater emphasis on musical flow for a quality album listening experience rather than in order of the movie's chronology. In some cases, tracks from different parts of the film are merged into a single track.

- Released on May 4, 1999.

No.	Title	Length
1.	"Star Wars Main Title and The Arrival at Naboo"	2:55
2.	"Duel of the Fates"	4:14
3.	"Anakin's Theme"	3:05
4.	"Jar Jar's Introduction and The Swim to Otoh Gunga"	5:07
5.	"The Sith Spacecraft and The Droid Battle"	2:37
6.	"The Trip to the Naboo Temple and The Audience with Boss Nass"	4:07
7.	"The Arrival at Tatooine and The Flag Parade"	4:04
8.	"He Is the Chosen One"	3:53
9.	"Anakin Defeats Sebulba"	4:24
10.	"Passage Through the Planet Core"	4:40
11.	"Watto's Deal and Kids at Play"	4:57
12.	"Panaka and the Queen's Protectors"	3:24
13.	"Queen Amidala and The Naboo Palace"	4:51
14.	"The Droid Invasion and The Appearance of Darth Maul"	5:14
15.	"Qui-Gon's Noble End"	3:48
16.	"The High Council Meeting and Qui-Gon's Funeral"	3:09
17.	"Augie's Great Municipal Band and End Credits"	9:37

=== Release history ===
Title	U.S. release date	Label	Format
Star Wars: Episode I – The Phantom Menace (Original Motion Picture Soundtrack)	May 4, 1999	Sony Classical	CD
Star Wars: Episode I – The Phantom Menace (Original Motion Picture Soundtrack – The Ultimate Edition)	November 14, 2000	Sony Classical	CD
Star Wars: Episode I – The Phantom Menace (Original Motion Picture Soundtrack – Limited Edition Vinyl)	March 14, 2014	Sony Classical	LP
Star Wars: The Ultimate Soundtrack Collection	January 8, 2016	Sony Classical	CD, LP, digital
Star Wars: The Phantom Menace (Original Motion Picture Soundtrack)	May 4, 2018	Walt Disney	Remastered CD, digital

== Ultimate Edition ==
=== Differences between versions ===
In the recording studio, Williams records cues multiple times. A track's film and album versions can be drastically different. One cue can be made up of several takes, putting together the best moments of each, replacing flubbed notes.

Since each track is run several times, each performance differs slightly. Occasionally, Williams will change orchestrations right on the spot. The score also makes use of several insert pieces which usually replace certain sections within a cue.

Examples of Different Takes:

- Track 4 on Disc 1 of the Ultimate Edition vs. Video Games: The version used in the film cut out the cue's end, which features a snare roll, followed by a cymbal crash, a three-note horn blast followed by a final horn blast/snare hit. The final chord was used instead at the end of "The Droid Invasion". This ending was used in Attack of the Clones as Mace Windu enters the Geonosian arena.
- Track 31 on Disc 1 of the Ultimate Edition vs. DVD vs. Track 7 of the 1-disc album vs video games: The film features loops and extended segments of "The Flag Parade" not featured in the UE. The Album also features a similar loop, as do the video games.
- Track 32 on Disc 1 of the Ultimate Edition vs. Film: The track segues straight into the ending moments of "The Flag Parade", whereas in the film, there is a considerable gap in between. Also, an abridged version of the cue's ending measures have been retained despite not appearing in the film.
- "Take to Your Ships": Take to Your Ships has many different orchestrations heard throughout the UE, the album, earlier and later LucasArts games.
- "Duel of the Fates" many versions: Duel of the Fates has several different orchestrations heard in the games, Album, and Ultimate Edition.
- "Anakin's Theme" vs. Alternate Take: The Alternate take heard in the games has a loud bang in the middle of the track (possibly from an instrumentalist hitting their stand). It also is shorter and eliminates the return to the descending middle segment.

=== Track listing ===
Due to the Ultimate Edition portrayal of the score as a film version, and to alleviate long tracks, certain tracks may be several minutes long, but are broken up into segments. When being played, the individual segments are separate tracks. The main track names are in bold and their separate portions follow.

- Released on November 14, 2000.

==== Disc 1 ====
No.	Title	Length
1.	"Fox Fanfare"	0:23

Treachery Within the Federation and the Invasion of Naboo
No.	Title	Length
2.	"Star Wars Main Title"	1:24
3.	"Boarding the Federation Battleship"	2:31
4.	"Death Warrant for Qui-Gon and Obi-Wan"	1:18
5.	"Fighting the Destroyer Droids"	1:44
6.	"Queen Amidala Warns the Federation"	2:23
7.	"The Droid Invasion"	1:00

Underwater Adventure
No.	Title	Length
8.	"Swimming to Otoh Gunga"	0:56
9.	"Inside the Bubble City"	3:05
10.	"Attack of the Giant Fish"	1:37

Darth Sidious and the Passage Through the Planet Core
No.	Title	Length
11.	"Darth Sidious"	1:04

On to Naboo and the Rescue of the Queen
No.	Title	Length
12.	"The Giant Squid and the Attack on Theed"	1:18
13.	"Qui-Gon and Obi-Wan Rescue The Queen"	2:09
14.	"Fighting the Guards"	1:42
15.	"Escape from Naboo"	2:04
16.	"Enter Darth Maul"	1:07

Destination Tatooine and Home of Anakin Skywalker
No.	Title	Length
17.	"The Arrival at Tatooine"	2:28
18.	"Street Band of Mos Espa"	1:16
19.	"Padme Meets Anakin"	1:12
20.	"Desert Winds (Bonus Track)"	1:28
21.	"Jar Jar’s Run-In with Sebulba"	1:18
22.	"Anakin’s Home and the Introduction to Threepio"	2:22

The Dark Forces Plot
No.	Title	Length
23.	"Darth Sidious and Darth Maul"	1:12

Qui-Gon Bets on Anakin
No.	Title	Length
24.	"Talk of Podracing"	2:58

Anakin Closes in on His Destiny
No.	Title	Length
25.	"Watto’s Deal / Shmi and Qui-Gon Talk"	2:24
26.	"Anakin and Podracer Mechanic"	1:38
27.	"The Racer Roars to Life and Anakin’s Midi-Chlorian Count"	1:24
28.	"Darth Maul and the Sith Spacecraft"	1:00
29.	"Mos Espa Arena Band"	0:53
30.	"Watto’s Roll of the Die"	1:59
31.	"The Flag Parade"	1:14
32.	"Sebulba’s Dirty Hand and Qui-Gon’s Pep Talk"	1:37

Anakin's Victory
No.	Title	Length
33.	"Anakin Defeats Sebulba"	2:17

The Cheering Crowd
No.	Title	Length
34.	"Hail to the Winner, Anakin Skywalker"	1:13

Mos Espa Folk Song
No.	Title	Length
35.	"The Street Singer"	1:13

==== Disc 2 ====
To Coruscant and to Palpatine and the Senate
No.	Title	Length
1.	"Anakin is Free"	5:04
2.	"Qui-Gon and Darth Maul Meet"	1:48
3.	"Anakin and Group to Coruscant"	4:11

Palpatine's Treachery
No.	Title	Length
4.	"The Queen and Palpatine"	0:41

Qui-Gon Goes Before Yoda
No.	Title	Length
5.	"High Council Meeting"	2:37

War Clouds and an Alliance with Boss Nass and the Gungans
No.	Title	Length
6.	"The Senate"	1:12
7.	"Anakin’s Test"	3:41
8.	"Qui-Gon’s Mission and Obi-Wan’s Warning"	3:47
9.	"Nute and Rune Confer with Darth Sidious"	0:29
10.	"The Queen and Group Land on Naboo"	2:19
11.	"Jar Jar Leads Group to the Gungans"	2:25
12.	"War Plans"	2:31

Prelude to War
No.	Title	Length
13.	"Darth Sidious Receives News of the Gungan Army"	0:25
14.	"The Gungans March"	0:57

The Great Battle Begins
No.	Title	Length
15.	"The Queen and Her Group Sneak Back to the Palace"	0:18
16.	"The Battle Begins"	0:24
17.	"The Republic Pilots Take Off Into Space"	1:26

The Battle Continues
No.	Title	Length
18.	"Activate the Droids"	0:44
19.	"The Gungans Fight Back"	0:24
20.	"The Duel Begins"	0:51
21.	"Anakin Takes Off in Spaceship"	0:47
22.	"The Duel Continues"	0:59
23.	"The Battle Rages On"	1:59
24.	"Qui-Gon, Obi-Wan And Darth Maul Continue Battle"	1:22

The War at Its Darkest
No.	Title	Length
25.	"Qui-Gon, Darth Maul and the Invisible Wall"	0:14
26.	"The Gungans Retreat and the Queen Surrenders"	2:18
27.	"The Death Of Qui-Gon and the Surrender of the Gungans"	2:28

Good Triumphs Over Evil
No.	Title	Length
28.	"The Tide Turns / The Death of Darth Maul"	3:24

The Wrap-Up
No.	Title	Length
29.	"The Queen Confronts Nute and Rune"	1:47
30.	"The Funeral of Qui-Gon"	1:18

Victory Parade
No.	Title	Length
31.	"The Parade"	1:24

Titles
No.	Title	Length
32.	"End Credits"	8:14
33.	"Duel of the Fates (Dialogue Version)" (Bonus Track)	4:21

== Limited Edition Vinyl Reissue ==
=== I Am Shark vinyl re-issue ===
I Am Shark reissued the original soundtrack to Star Wars: Episode I: The Phantom Menace on vinyl in late 2014, making it part one of three planned vinyl re-releases of the prequel trilogy soundtracks. The A.V. Club wrote of the I Am Shark vinyl edition:

John Williams’ score is wonderful, and his use of leitmotif and the way he creates new themes while weaving in existing music from the saga is a treat. Williams is truly a master of Wagnerian-bombast and baroque composition, and when “Duel Of The Fates” kicks in, the Star Wars faithful can just sit there, listening and wishing that the theme was from a much better movie. The vinyl mastering on the release is also very good, and retains that certain warmth that you can’t get from the digital releases.

The album was released in a two-LP format, with limited color versions coordinating with characters and elements from the film:

- Qui-Gon Jinn — green/brown marble
- Obi-Wan Kenobi — transparent blue
- Darth Maul — black with red and gold stripe
- Hyperdrive — white spatter on black
- Dark Side — 180 gram

== Recording Information ==
During production, several scenes from the final reel were re-edited and re-arranged. Due to this, several recorded cues did not appear in the film, and are instead replaced by Duel of the Fates.

=== Cue List ===
- 1M2 Main Title (February 5, 1999)
- 1M3 The Arrival (February 5, 1999)
- 1M4 Gas Leak (February 10, 1999)
- 1M4A Droid Fight (February 5, 1999)
- 1M5 Queen Amidala (February 15, 1999)
- 1M6 The Droid Invasion (February 12, 1999)
- 1M7 Introducing Jar Jar (February 16, 1999)
- 1M8 The Bubble World (February 16, 1999)
- 1M9 Gone Fishing (February 16, 1999)
- 2M1 Darth Sidious (February 10, 1999)
- 2M1A Monsters Back (February 12, 1999)
- 2M2 Theed Palace Arrival (February 5, 1999)
- 2M3 You're Under Arrest (February 11, 1999)
- 2M3A Take Off (February 6, 1999)
- 2M4 Introducing Darth Maul (February 10, 1999)
- 2M6 Desert Winds (February 17, 1999)
- 2M5 The Arrival of Tattoine (February 15, 1999)
- 2M7 I'm A Pilot You Know (February 15, 1999)
- 2M10 Stealing Food (February 6, 1999)
- 2M11 Through the Slave Quarters (February 16, 1999)
- 3M1 Running Out Of Time (February 10, 1999)
- 3M2 Are You A Jedi? (February 6, 1999)
- 3M3 Watto's Deal (February 11, 1999)
- 3M4 Kids at Play (February 12, 1999)
- 3M5 It's Working (February 15, 1999)
- 3M6 The Sith Spacecraft (February 11, 1999)
- 3M7 Mos Espa Arena Band (February 17, 1999)
- 3M8 Watto's Big Deal (February 15, 1999)
- 3M9 The Flag Parade (February 15, 1999)
- 3M10 Start Your Engines (February 15, 1999)
- 3M11 The Race Begins (February 6, 1999)
- 4M2 Anakin's Defeats Sebulba (February 5, 1999)
- 4M3 Anakins Great Victory (February 11, 1999)
- 4M4 The Street Singer (February 17, 1999)
- 4M5 Anakin is Free (February 5, 1999)
- 4M6 Darth and Qui-Gon (February 12, 1999)
- 4M7-8 Naboo Palace (February 14, 1999)
- 4M9 The Queen and Palpatine (February 6, 1999)
- 5M1 High Council Meeting (February 15, 1999)
- 5M2 The Senate Speech (February 6, 1999)
- 5M3 Anakin's Test (February 11, 1999)
- 5M3 Insert (February 15, 1999)
- 5M4-5 The Chosen One (February 12, 1999)
- 5M6 More Nute and Rune (February 10, 1999)
- 5M7 Moving Forward (February 6, 1999)
- 5M8 The Gungans (February 6, 1999)
- 5M9 Promoting Jar Jar (February 16, 1999)
- 6M1N The Armies Face-Off (February 14, 1999)
- 6M1-Pt2 The Armies Face-Off (February 14, 1999)
- 6M1X Randy's Forest Mist (February 17, 1999)
- 6M2 Lazer Fight (February 14, 1999)
- 6M2-Pt2 Lazer Fight (February 14, 1999)
- 6M3 Take To Your Ships (February 12, 1999)
- 6M3N Take To Your Ships (February 16, 1999)
- 6M4 The Big Army (February 14, 1999)
- 6M4A The Fight Begins (February 10, 1999)
- 6M5 Droid Battle (February 14, 1999)
- 6M6 Up the Wire (February 14, 1999)
- 6M7 The Great Dual (February 10, 1999)
- 6M7-Pt2 The Great Dual (February 16, 1999)
- 6M8-9 Qui-Gon's Noble End (February 11, 1999)
- 6M10 Blowups and the Death of Darth Maul (February 15, 1999)
- 6M11N End of Darth Maul (February 11, 1999)
- 7M1 After the Victory (February 15, 1999)
- 7M1A Qui-Gon's Funeral (February 10, 1999)
- 7M1N After the Victory (February 15, 1999)
- 7M2 Joe/Randy (February 17, 1999)
- 7M2 Joe/Randy 1 (February 17, 1999)
- 7M2 Source (Brass) (February 9, 1999)
- 7M2 Source (Perc) (February 17, 1999)
- 7M2 Source (Randy) (February 17, 1999)
- 7M2 The Big Parade (February 17, 1999)
- 7M2N Augie's Great Municipal Band (Not Assigned)
- 7M3 End Credits (February 10, 1999)
- 7M3 End Credits Insert (February 16, 1999)
- 7M3 Throne Room (February 6, 1999)
- Anakin's Theme (February 12, 1999)
- George's String Cluster (February 16, 1999)
- Throne Room (End Credits) (Not Assigned)

== Charts ==
Chart performance for Star Wars: Episode I – The Phantom Menace soundtrack
Chart (1999)	Peak position
Australian Albums (ARIA)	8
Austrian Albums (Ö3 Austria)	3
Belgian Albums (Ultratop Flanders)	37
Belgian Albums (Ultratop Wallonia)	22
Canada Top Albums/CDs (RPM)	9
Dutch Albums (Album Top 100)	40
Finnish Albums (Suomen virallinen lista)	17
French Albums (SNEP)	25
German Albums (Offizielle Top 100)	6
Hungarian Albums (MAHASZ)	9
New Zealand Albums (RMNZ)	23
Norwegian Albums (VG-lista)	29
Swedish Albums (Sverigetopplistan)	47
Swiss Albums (Schweizer Hitparade)	17
UK Albums (Official Charts)	8
US Billboard 200	3

== Certifications ==
Certifications for Star Wars: Episode I – The Phantom Menace soundtrack
Region	Certification	Certified units/sales
Australia (ARIA)	Gold	35,000^{^}
Germany (BVMI)	Gold	250,000^{‡}
Japan (RIAJ)	Gold	100,000^{^}
Poland (ZPAV)	Gold	50,000^{*}
Spain (Promusicae)	2× Platinum	200,000^{^}
United Kingdom (BPI)	Gold	100,000^{^}
United States (RIAA)	Platinum	1,000,000^{^}
^{*} Sales figures based on certification alone.^{^} Shipments figures based on certification alone.^{‡} Sales+streaming figures based on certification alone.
