= Memoirs of a Geisha (soundtrack) =

Memoirs of a Geisha: Original Motion Picture Soundtrack

Film score by John Williams
- Released: November 22, 2005
- Recorded: 2005
- Studio: Sony Pictures Studios
- Genre: Soundtrack
- Length: 61:02
- Label: Sony Classical
- Producer: John Williams

John Williams chronology
War of the Worlds (2005)	Memoirs of a Geisha: Original Motion Picture Soundtrack (2005)	Munich (2005)

Professional ratings
Review scores
Source	Rating
ScoreNotes	9/10 stars
SoundtrackNet	4/5 stars

Memoirs of a Geisha: Original Motion Picture Soundtrack is the film score to the 2005 film of the same name, composed and conducted by John Williams. The original score and songs were composed and conducted by Williams and features Yo-Yo Ma and Itzhak Perlman as cellist and violinist. The soundtrack album was released by Sony Classical Records on November 22, 2005.

The score won the Golden Globe Award for Best Original Score, BAFTA Award for Best Film Music and the Grammy Award for Best Score Soundtrack for Visual Media. It was also nominated for the Academy Award for Best Original Score.

== Track listing ==
1. Sayuri's Theme 1:31
2. The Journey to the Hanamachi 4:06
3. Going to School 2:42
4. Brush on Silk 2:31
5. Chiyo's Prayer 3:36
6. Becoming a Geisha 4:52
7. Finding Satsu 3:44
8. The Chairman's Waltz 2:39
9. The Rooftops of the Hanamachi 3:49
10. The Garden Meeting 2:44
11. Dr. Crab's Prize 2:18
12. Destiny's Path 3:20
13. A New Name... A New Life 3:33
14. The Fire Scene and the Coming of War 6:48
15. As the Water... 2:01
16. Confluence 3:42
17. A Dream Discarded 2:00
18. Sayuri's Theme and End Credits 5:06

Total Time: 61:02

== Personnel ==
- Yo-Yo Ma – cello
- Itzhak Perlman – violin
- Masakazu Yoshizawa - shakuhachi, tsutsumi
- Masayo Ishigure - koto
- Hiromi Hashibe - koto
- Tateo Takahashi - shamisen
- Tom Gire - synthesizer programming
