= Duel of the Fates =

- The cover of the one-track promotional release of "Duel of the Fates"

Single by John Williams

from the album Star Wars: Episode I – The Phantom Menace (soundtrack)
- Released: 1999
- Recorded: February 1999 Abbey Road Studio 1, London
- Genre: Film soundtrack
- Length: 4:14
- Label: Sony Classical
- Songwriter: John Williams

"Duel of the Fates" is a musical theme recurring in the Star Wars prequel trilogy and the Expanded Universe. It was composed by John Williams and recorded for the film soundtrack of Star Wars Episode I: The Phantom Menace by the London Symphony Orchestra (LSO) and the London Voices. This symphonic piece is played with both a full orchestra and a choir. The lyrics are based on a fragment of an archaic Welsh poem, Cad Goddeu (Battle of the Trees), and are sung in Sanskrit. The piece debuts during the final lightsaber duel in The Phantom Menace. With the music video for this theme, the LSO became the only classical group ever to have a video debut on MTV’s Total Request Live. "Duel of the Fates" lasted 11 days on the countdown.

== Composition ==
"Duel of the Fates" was composed by John Williams and recorded by the London Symphony Orchestra (LSO) and the London Voices for the film soundtrack of Star Wars: Episode I – The Phantom Menace. The symphonic piece is played with both a full orchestra and a choir. The lyrics are based on a fragment of an archaic Welsh poem, Cad Goddeu (Battle of the Trees), and sung in Sanskrit. The translation was loose and Williams arranged it by ear, while rearranging the syllables, so the pronunciation of the Sanskrit is not accurate and the meaning of the stanza is lost in the actual singing. "Duel of the Fates" begins with a chorus constructed by John Williams, which Williams believes adds a religious and temple-like feel to the epic lightsaber duel.

The piece is mainly polyphonic and is in the keys of E and G minor. It has a tempo of roughly 152 bpm, and a duple meter with a time signature of 4/4. The composition is four minutes and fourteen seconds long.

Although Williams conducted "Duel of the Fates" to appear as a concert suite in the closing credits (rather than during the film proper), Williams did record similar cues using the ostinato motif, and in one instance, a 'cut down' version, labelled the "Great Duel". Williams stated the chorus was introduced to give a religious, temple-like feel to the epic lightsaber duel. He compared the setting of the battle to a pagan altar, and that the duel itself "seems like a dance or a ballet, a religious ceremony of some kind, probably ending in the death of one of the combatants".

== Appearances in Star Wars ==
The music had its debut during the final lightsaber duel between Qui-Gon Jinn, Obi-Wan Kenobi, and Darth Maul in Star Wars: Episode I – The Phantom Menace. The beginning portion used on the soundtrack is replaced with the beginning of a separate track titled Qui-Gon's Noble End; however, the full version of the original recording is used during the film's end credits.

An abridged version is played in Star Wars: Episode II – Attack of the Clones when Anakin Skywalker used a swoop bike to search for his mother.

The piece "Battle of the Heroes", which was played in Star Wars: Episode III – Revenge of the Sith, during the battle sequence between Yoda and Darth Sidious in the senate chamber on Coruscant, and the simultaneous battle between Darth Vader and Obi-Wan Kenobi on Mustafar, had a piece of "Duel of the Fates", but rewritten in a tragic mode. Lucas had expressed in a documentary of The Phantom Menace that he wanted to use “Duel of the Fates” in Star Wars: Episode III – Revenge of the Sith as he liked the feeling of the work. However, he decided not to use it mainly because it did not match the tragic mood of the duel between Obi-Wan and Vader. “Duel of the Fates” makes an appearance during the Yoda/Sidious fight scene. For this instance, John Williams re-recorded the choir and layered it over the vocal-less recording from Episode I.

"Duel of the Fates" can be heard in a number of Star Wars video games, including Star Wars Episode I: Racer, The Clone Wars, Lego Star Wars, Revenge of the Sith video game, Star Wars: Empire at War, Star Wars Battlefront II, Star Wars: The Force Unleashed, Star Wars: The Old Republic, and Angry Birds Star Wars II. The theme also plays during Soulcalibur IV, whenever The Apprentice fights within either of the game's three Star Wars-themed stages, as well as during his extended ending. "Duel of the Fates" also plays when Darth Maul appears during the Jedi Training Academy show featured at Disney's Hollywood Studios and Disneyland.

A special of Lego Star Wars called "The Empire Strikes Out" features a short section of "Duel of the Fates", in which Darth Maul hums along with the music while declaring how "awesome" he is.

Another Lego Star Wars special, entitled The Yoda Chronicles: Menace of the Sith, also featured "Duel of the Fates". Count Dooku plays the music on a radio during a demonstration of the Sith clone Jek-14's power. Darth Maul complains that "Duel of the Fates" is his theme song, to which Asajj Ventress replies "Can somebody say diva?".

"Duel of the Fates" can also be heard softly in the background when Maul appears in Solo: A Star Wars Story.

"Duel of the Fates" is heard in a TV spot for Star Wars: The Rise of Skywalker titled "Duel", in which it is mixed with "The Imperial March". Additionally, Duel of the Fates was the title of a working script by Colin Trevorrow and Derek Connolly for Episode IX before the film was re-envisioned as The Rise of Skywalker.

A reorchestrated version of the song can be heard in The Clone Wars episode "The Phantom Apprentice" while the characters Ahsoka Tano and Maul duel.

Elements of the song were used in the teaser trailer for Obi-Wan Kenobi.

Star Wars: Maul – Shadow Lord prominently features "Duel of the Fates" throughout its soundtrack.

== Reception ==
Despite only being slightly used in the film The Phantom Menace, the theme "Duel of the Fates" has gone on to define the music of the prequel trilogy. It was so loved by fans that it went on to be blended into the theme "Battle of the Heroes" in Revenge of the Sith.

=== Use outside Star Wars ===
"Duel of the Fates" has also been used to reference and satirize Star Wars. For instance, in The Simpsons episode "Please Homer, Don't Hammer 'Em", the song plays in a sequence parodying Star Wars, during an allergen-stick (of shrimp and peanut) battle between Bart Simpson and Seymour Skinner.

The Boston Pops performed the piece as the Montreal Canadiens and Boston Bruins entered Gillette Stadium for the 2016 NHL Winter Classic.

The piece has frequently been used by Premier League football club Tottenham Hotspur, initially in 2004 as part of a pre-game video package prior to playing local rivals Arsenal, but has since been used as player walk-out music in the years since.

== Certifications ==
Region	Certification	Certified units/sales
United States (RIAA)	Gold	500,000^{‡}
^{‡} Sales+streaming figures based on certification alone.

== See also ==
- Music of Star Wars
- "Battle of the Heroes"
- "O Fortuna" the inspirational ostinato motif by Carl Orff.
