= War of the Worlds (soundtrack) =

War of the Worlds (Music from the Motion Picture)

Film score by John Williams
- Released: June 21, 2005
- Recorded: 2005
- Studio: Sony Scoring Stage, Sony Pictures Studios, Culver City, California
- Genre: Film score
- Length: 61:01
- Label: Decca
- Producer: John Williams

John Williams chronology
Star Wars: Episode III – Revenge of the Sith (2005)	War of the Worlds (2005)	Memoirs of a Geisha (2005)

War of the Worlds (Music from the Motion Picture) is the film score to the 2005 film War of the Worlds directed by Steven Spielberg, starring Tom Cruise, Dakota Fanning, Miranda Otto and Tim Robbins. The film score is composed and conducted by his recurrent collaborator John Williams, performed by the Hollywood Studio Symphony and released through Decca Records on June 21, 2005.

== Development ==
Longtime Spielberg collaborator John Williams composed the score. It was the first time he had to compose with an incomplete Spielberg film, as only the first six reels, totalling 60 minutes, were ready for him to use as reference. He considered the score "a very serious piece," which had to combine "necessary frightening atmosphere" with "propulsively rhythmic drive for the action scenes"—the music would be symbolically "pulling forward" vehicles in chase scenes, such as Ferrier driving out of Bayonne, or the Tripod attacking the Hudson ferry. Williams added small nods to classic monster movie scores by having orchestras doing a "grand gesture" in scenes overlooking Tripods. To increase the scariness of the Tripod attacks, Williams added a female chorus with a crescendo resembling a shriek, representing "victims that go out without saying an 'ouch'—they're gone before they can say that". He added a nearly inaudible male choir—which he compared to "Tibetan monks, the lowest known pitch our bodies can make", for the aliens exploring the basement. The only deviation from orchestras were electronic sounds for the opening and closing narrations. Besides the score, the film also featured the songs "Little Deuce Coupe" and "Hushabye Mountain" are also featured in the movie, the former sung by Tom Cruise, and the latter by Dakota Fanning.

== Release ==
A soundtrack album was released by Decca Records featuring the film's music and Morgan Freeman's opening and closing narrations. An expanded "limited edition" soundtrack was released in 2020 through Intrada Records, with the full film score, a remaster of the 2005 album, and alternate cues as bonus material.

== Track listing ==
=== Standard edition ===
No.	Title	Length
1.	"Prologue"	2:52
2.	"The Ferry Scene"	5:49
3.	"Reaching the Country"	3:24
4.	"The Intersection Scene"	4:13
5.	"Ray and Rachel"	2:41
6.	"Escape from the City"	3:49
7.	"Probing the Basement"	4:12
8.	"Refugee Status"	3:50
9.	"The Attack on the Car"	2:44
10.	"The Separation of the Family"	2:36
11.	"The Confrontation with Ogilvy"	4:34
12.	"The Return to Boston"	4:29
13.	"Escape from the Basket"	9:21
14.	"The Reunion"	3:16
15.	"Epilogue"	3:11
Total length:		61:01

=== Expanded edition ===
Disc 1
No.	Title	Length
1.	"Prologue and Opening Montage"	2:54
2.	"Is It Over?"	3:05
3.	"The Intersection Scene (Film Version)^{[b]}"	4:10
4.	"What Happened?"	3:36
5.	"Driving Away from Trouble^{[b]}"	3:39
6.	"Surveying Wreckage/Watch the Lightning^{[a]}"	2:15
7.	"Bodies in the Water/Ray and Rachel^{[b]}"	3:47
8.	"Attacking the Car^{[b]}"	2:53
9.	"In the Cafe^{[a]}"	1:12
10.	"The Ferry Scene (Extended Version)^{[b]}"	5:56
11.	"Woods Walk^{[a]}"	1:55
12.	"Refugee Status (Extended Version)^{[b]}"	4:12
13.	"Robbie Joins the Fight"	3:27
14.	"The Basement^{[a]}"	2:42
15.	"Harlan Ogilvy^{[a]}"	2:37
16.	"Probing the Basement (Extended Version)^{[b]}"	4:24
17.	"The Aliens^{[a]}"	3:16
18.	"Ogilvy's End^{[a]}"	1:49
19.	"Red Planet^{[b]}"	3:56
20.	"The Basket^{[b]}"	3:17
21.	"The Entrance to Boston^{[b]}"	4:43
22.	"Defeat and Reunion^{[b]}"	2:35
23.	"Boston Street Finale^{[b]}"	2:13
24.	"Closing Montage^{[b]}"	1:36
25.	"Epilogue (Film Version)"	3:14
Total length:		79:23

Disc 2
No.	Title	Length
1.	"Prologue"	2:53
2.	"The Ferry Scene"	5:49
3.	"Reaching the Country"	3:24
4.	"The Intersection Scene"	4:14
5.	"Ray and Rachel"	2:41
6.	"Escape from the City"	3:50
7.	"Probing the Basement"	4:13
8.	"Refugee Status"	3:51
9.	"The Attack on the Car"	2:44
10.	"The Separation of the Family"	2:37
11.	"The Confrontation with Ogilvy"	4:35
12.	"The Return to Boston"	4:29
13.	"Escape from the Basket"	9:21
14.	"The Reunion"	3:17
15.	"Epilogue"	3:13
16.	"Prologue and Opening Montage (Alternate)^{[a]}"	2:43
17.	"Before the Escape"	0:35
18.	"The Entrance to Boston (Alternate)^{[b]}"	4:40
19.	"Boston Street Finale (Alternate No. 1)^{[a]}"	2:03
20.	"Boston Street Finale (Alternate No. 2)^{[a]}"	2:00
21.	"Epilogue (Alternate)^{[a]}"	3:24
Total length:		76:36

Notes

- ^{^a} previously unreleased
- ^{^b} contains previously unreleased music

== Reception ==
James Christopher Monger of AllMusic wrote "In the context of the film, Williams' vision for War of the Worlds more than matches the apocalyptic dread of Welles' original vision, but as a stand-alone listening experience, only those with a true fanboy masochistic streak will be able to withstand such a continuous and ominous barrage of sci-fi dissonance." Christian Clemmensen of Filmtracks wrote "At an hour in length, the album is an interesting listening experience for those score collectors who appreciate Williams' high standards of complexity, but the score will more likely alienate the majority of his fans who prefer his scores to have strong lines of thematic cohesion and an obvious concert arrangement." Tom Hoover of Scorenotes wrote called it an "effective, disinteresting score for a subpar Spielberg blockbuster." Dan Goldwasser of Soundtrack.Net wrote "As a soundtrack, it has its moments certainly, but it's not likely to be an album that you'll keep in the CD player or toss in to listen to for fun."

Jonathan Broxton of Movie Music UK wrote "Personally, I found War of the Worlds to be a hugely satisfying listening experience – certainly more so than Revenge of the Sith. Although I can envisage a number of listeners complaining about its lack of thematic content and generally harsh tone, it nevertheless impresses with its relentless nature and intelligent structure, and shows why at the age of 73 he remains firmly at the top of his game." James Southall of Movie Wave wrote "War of the Worlds is a rare Williams score with no real main theme, but it isn't hampered by that at all [...] the music is completely riveting, always drawing the listener in with quieter moments before unleashing another barrage of orchestral terror. This is not a score as broad or as satisfying as Revenge of the Sith was just a few weeks earlier, but it amply demonstrates that Williams remains at the top of his game."

Calling it a "downright brilliant stuff", Thomas Glorieux of Maintitles wrote "This is not a soundtrack you put up to entertain yourself for a couple of hours, nor is this an experience you'll gladly want to revisit if you're feeling somewhat depressed. But I think you have to see War of the Worlds both ways here and not see it from just a listening point of view. Because that would make one diminish the unbelievable qualities War of the Worlds definitely possesses." Zanobard Reviews wrote "War of the Worlds is one of John Williams' much lesser known scores, but that doesn't stop it from being an incredibly atmospheric, thought-provoking and spine-chilling musical experience."

Kayti Burt of Den of Geek called it "an understated soundtrack from John Williams". Tyler Eschberger of Bloody Disgusting wrote "John Williams's haunting score personifies the shrill screams of absolute terror just before a person is zapped from existence." Rob Mackle of The Guardian called it a "bass-heavy Jawsy" score. David Edelstein of Slate wrote "John Williams provides some ambient, almost subliminal accompaniment, but much of the action has no music underneath it. It's the silence—and the otherworldly sound—that eats into your mind." A. O. Scott of The New York Times wrote "[John Williams'] score is striking partly as a result of how sparingly it is used. For long stretches of the movie, you hear no music at all, which deepens both the realism and the dread, and immerses you more fully in what you are seeing."

== Personnel ==
Credits adapted from liner notes:

- Music composer and producer – John Williams
- Recording and mixing – Shawn Murphy
- Mastering – Patricia Sullivan-FourStar
- Music editor – Peter Myles
- Scoring crew – Adam Michalak, Bryan Clements, Greg Loskorn, Mark Eshelman, Bob Wolff, Sue McLean
- Package coordination – Fanny Gotschall, Laura A.A. Johnson
- Soundtrack album coordination – Meredith Friedman, Paul Altomari
- Copyist – Jo Ann Kane Music Service
- Liner notes – Steven Spielberg
- Chairman for Universal Classics Group – Chris Roberts
- Music business affairs for Universal Classics Group – Sheryl Gold
- A&R administration – Evelyn Morgan
- A&R direction – David Novik, Marc Johnston, Randy Dry

Orchestra and choir

- Orchestra – Hollywood Studio Symphony
- Chorus – Hollywood Film Chorale
- Orchestrator and conductor – John Williams
- Orchestra contractor – Sandy De Crescent
- Vocal contractor – Sally Stevens

Instruments

- Bass – Bruce Morgenthaler, Christian Kollgaard, David Parmeter, Drew Dembowski, Ed Meares, Mike Valerio, Nico Carmine Abondolo, Richard Feves, Steve Edelman, Sue Ranney
- Bassoon – Allen Savedoff, David Riddles, Ken Munday, Michael O'Donovan, Rose Corrigan
- Cello – Andrew Shulman, Tony Cooke, Armen Ksajikian, Cecilia Tsan, David Low, David Speltz, Dennis Karmazyn, John Walz, Roger Lebow, Rowena Hamill, Steve Erdody, Tim Landauer
- Clarinet – Gary Bovyer, Lawrence Hughes, Phil O'Connor, Ralph Williams, Steve Roberts
- Flute – Geri Rotella, Jim Walker, Louise Ditullio
- Harp – Jo Ann Turovsky
- Horn – Brad Warnaar, Brian O'Connor, Daniel Kelley, David Duke, Jim Thatcher, John Reynolds, Kristy Morrell, Kurt Snyder, Mark Adams, Phil Yao, Rick Todd, Steven Becknell
- Oboe – Barbara Northcutt, David Weiss, Leslie Reed, Phillip Ayling, Tom Boyd
- Percussion – Alan Estes, Don Williams, Greg Goodall, Jerry Williams, Michael Fisher, Peter Limonick, Steve Schaeffer, Tom Raney
- Piano – Bryan Pezzone, Chet Swiatkowski, Mike Lang, Randy Kerber
- Trombone – Andy Malloy, Bill Reichenbach, George Thatcher, James Sawyer, Phil Teele, Bill Booth
- Trumpet – David Washburn, Jon Lewis, Malcolm Mc Nab, Marissa Benedict, Timothy Morrison, Warren Leuning
- Tuba – Doug Tornquist, Fred Greene, Jim Self
- Viola – Andrew Duckles, Brian Dembow, Carrie Holzman-Little, Cassandra Richburg, Dan Neufeld, Darrin Mc Cann, David Walther, Denyse Buffum, Evan Wilson, Janet Lakatos, Jennie Hansen, Keith Greene, Matt Funes, Pamela Goldsmith, Piotr Jandula, Robert Becker, Robert Berg, Roland Kato, Samuel Formicola, Shawn Mann, Simon Oswell, Steve Gordon, Thomas Diener, Vickie Miskolczy
- Violin – Aimee Kreston, Alan Grunfeld, Ana Landauer, Anatoly Rosinsky, Bruce Dukov, Clayton Haslop, Darius Campo, Dimitrie Leivici, Endre Granat, Eun Mee Ahn, Jackie Brand, Jeannie Skrocki Evans, Julie Gigante, Katia Popov, Ken Yerke, Kevin Connolly, Liane Mautner, Lisa Sutton, Marc Sazer, Mark Robertson, Miran Kojian, Miwako Watanabe, Phillip Levy, Rafael Rishik, Rene Mandel, Richard Altenbach, Roberto Cani, Sara Parkins, Sarah Thornblade, Tammy Hatwan

== Accolades ==
Award	Date of the ceremony	Category	Recipients	Result	Ref.
BMI Film & TV Awards	May 17, 2006	Film Music Award	John Williams	Won	
Saturn Awards	May 2, 2006	Best Music	John Williams	Nominated	
International Film Music Critics Association	February 23, 2006	Best Original Score for a Fantasy/Science Fiction Film	John Williams	Nominated	
World Soundtrack Awards	October 18, 2005	Best Original Score of the Year	John Williams	Won	
