= Angela's Ashes (soundtrack) =

Soundtrack album by John Williams
- Released: December 7, 1999
- Genre: Score
- Length: 58:57
- Label: Sony Classical

John Williams chronology
Star Wars Episode I: The Phantom Menace (1999)	Angela's Ashes (1999)	The Patriot (2000)

Professional ratings
Review scores
Source	Rating
SoundtrackNet	4/5 stars
Tracksounds	9/10 stars

Angela's Ashes: Music from the Motion Picture is the soundtrack, on the Sony Classical label, of the 1999 film starring Emily Watson and Robert Carlyle. The original score was composed and conducted by John Williams. The record was originally released on December 7, 1999.

The album was nominated for the Academy Award for Best Original Score (where it lost to the score of The Red Violin), and for the Golden Globe Award for Best Original Score (where it lost to the score of The Legend of 1900).

The US edition of the album, from Sony Classical, includes narration from the film, spoken by actor Andrew Bennett, over portions of almost every track. The European edition of the album, from Decca Records, features only Williams's score, without the narration.

== Track listing ==
1. "Theme from "Angela's Ashes" – 6:18
2. "My Story" – 2:19
3. "Angela's Prayer" – 4:47
4. "My Dad's Stories" – 1:55
5. "Lord, Why Do You Want the Wee Children" – 4:03
6. "Plenty of Fish and Chips in Heaven" – 3:41
7. "The Dippsy Doodle" – 1:30
  - Performed by Nat Gonella & His Georgians
8. "The Lanes of Limerick" – 3:37
  - Performed by JoAnn Turovsky
9. "My Dad" – 3:31
10. "Pennies from Heaven" – 2:11
  - Performed by Billie Holiday
11. "My Mother Begging" – 3:46
12. "If I Were in America" – 2:34
13. "Delivering Telegrams" – 2:23
14. "I Think of Teresa" – 1:50
15. "Angels Never Cough" – 2:38
16. "Watching the Eclipse" – 3:00
17. "Back to America" – 2:38
18. "End Credit Reprise" – 6:16
