= A.I. Artificial Intelligence (soundtrack) =

A.I.: Artificial Intelligence - Music from the Motion Picture

Soundtrack album by John Williams
- Released: 2001
- Recorded: February – March 2001
- Studios: Sony Pictures Studios; Royce Hall, Los Angeles, CA
- Label: Warner Sunset (original); La-La Land Records (2015 re-issue)
- Producer: John Williams

John Williams chronology
The Patriot (2000)	A.I.: Artificial Intelligence - Music from the Motion Picture (2001)	Harry Potter and the Philosopher's Stone (2001)

Professional ratings
Review scores
Source	Rating
AllMusic	4/5 stars
Empire	4/5 stars
Filmtracks	4/5 stars
SoundtrackNet	3.5/5 stars
Tracksounds	9/10 stars

A.I. Artificial Intelligence - Music from the Motion Picture is the film score of the 2001 film of the same name, composed and conducted by John Williams. The original score was composed by Williams and featured singers Lara Fabian on two songs and Josh Groban on one. Soprano Barbara Bonney provided the vocal solos in several tracks.

== Background ==
The album was nominated for the Academy Award for Best Original Score (ceding to the score of The Lord of the Rings: The Fellowship of the Ring), the Golden Globe Award for Best Original Score (ceding to the score of Moulin Rouge!) and the Grammy Award for Best Score Soundtrack for Visual Media (ceding to the score of Crouching Tiger, Hidden Dragon).

The 2001 official soundtrack album did not include all of the music from the film, and several cues were conspicuously absent. A promotion-only release of the complete soundtrack was created for members of the Academy of Motion Picture Arts and Sciences that were responsible for voting for the award for Best Original Score. This version of the soundtrack later leaked to the public, and has been issued in several bootleg editions by various record labels. Then, in 2015, the complete score was officially issued for the first time in a 3-CD set by La-La Land Records.

== Original WB Track listing ==
The cues presented on the initial commercial release do not follow the order they are heard in the film. The album cues can be heard in the following order: 6, 4, 2, 7, 10, 1, 3, 11, 8, 12, 9.

Track listing

No.	Title	Length
1.	"The Mecha World"	6:23
2.	"Abandoned In the Woods"	3:07
3.	"Replicas"	5:57
4.	"Hide and Seek"	3:08
5.	"For Always (Performed by Lara Fabian)"	4:41
6.	"Cybertronics"	3:31
7.	"The Moon Rising"	4:26
8.	"Stored Memories and Monica's Theme (ft. Barbara Bonney)"	10:56
9.	"Where Dreams Are Born (Vocals by Barbara Bonney)"	4:23
10.	"Rouge City"	4:57
11.	"The Search for the Blue Fairy (ft. Barbara Bonney)"	6:11
12.	"The Reunion"	7:45
13.	"For Always (Duet performed by Lara Fabian and Josh Groban)"	4:43

== Complete score ==
La-La Land Records released John Williams' complete score to A.I. Artificial Intelligence in 2015 as a Limited Edition 3-CD set of 3000 units. The album contains the entire score as heard in the film in chronological order as well as alternate and extended versions of key cues in the film. This reissue was produced, assembled and mastered by Mike Matessino and it also features exclusive, in-depth liner notes by Jeff Bond as well as art design by Jim Titus.

Disc one

1. Cybertronics - 3:33
2. Henry Is Selected - 1:54
3. David's Arrival - 2:46
4. Of Course I'm Not Sure - 2:41
5. Hide and Seek (extended version) - 3:25
6. David Studies Monica - 2:06
7. Reading the Words - 5:58
8. Wearing Perfume - 4:13
9. Martin Is Alive - 1:30
10. David and Martin - 2:19
11. Canoeing With Pinocchio - 1:36
12. David and the Spinach / The Operating Scene - 3:07
13. The Scissor Scene - 3:48
14. The Pool Rescue - 1:42
15. Monica's Plan - 3:30
16. Abandoned in the Woods (extended version) - 3:57
17. The Moon Rising / The Biker Hounds - 5:10
18. Remembering David Hobby - 2:20
19. Journey to Rouge City - 3:51
20. Immaculate Heart - :46
21. To Manhattan - 1:28
22. A.I. Theme (instrumental version) - 4:08

Disc two

1. The Mecha World (extended version) - 8:43
2. Replicas - 5:59
3. Finding the Blue Fairy - 6:02
4. Journey Through the Ice (Part 1) - 4:43
5. Journey Through the Ice (Part 2) - 5:07
6. Stored Memories - 3:08
7. What Is Your Wish - 4:10
8. The Specialist Visits - 4:03
9. The Reunion - 7:50
10. Where Dreams Are Born - 4:23
11. A.I. Theme (vocal version) 4:01

Disc three

1. For Always (Performed by Lara Fabian) - 4:45
2. Cybertronics (alternate) - 3:08
3. David's Arrival (alternate) - 3:10
4. Canoeing With Pinocchio (alternate) - 1:57
5. Abandoned in the Woods (alternate) - 3:34
6. The Biker Hounds (extension) - 2:38
7. Inside Dr. Know's - 4:30
8. Replicas (alternate) - 4:02
9. Finding the Blue Fairy (alternate) - 6:00
10. Finding the Blue Fairy (orchestral excerpt) - 3:43
11. What Is Your Wish (alternate) - 4:07
12. The Reunion (alternate) 7:01
13. Abandoned in the Woods (album version) - 3:10
14. For Always (Duet) (Performed by Lara Fabian and Josh Groban) - 4:45

Total 3-Disc Time: 180:28
