= The Patriot (soundtrack) =

Film score by John Williams
- Released: June 27, 2000
- Genre: Soundtrack
- Label: Hollywood

John Williams chronology
Angela's Ashes (1999)	The Patriot (2000)	A.I. (2001)

Professional ratings
Review scores
Source	Rating
AllMusic	3/5 stars
Empire	4/5 stars
Filmtracks	4/5 stars
SoundtrackNet	4/5 stars
Tracksounds	8/10 stars

The Patriot is the soundtrack, on the Hollywood Records label, of the 2000 film The Patriot starring Mel Gibson, Heath Ledger, Joely Richardson, Jason Isaacs and Chris Cooper. The original score was composed and conducted by John Williams. Williams replaced composer David Arnold on the project after Arnold's original sketches were rejected. The album was nominated for the Academy Award for Best Original Score.

In January 2025, a 3-CD album comprising the complete score presentation and several alternate cues was released by Intrada Records.

== Track listing ==
Track listing

No.	Title	Length
1.	"The Patriot"	6:39
2.	"The Family Farm"	3:04
3.	"To Charleston"	2:15
4.	"The Colonial Cause"	3:15
5.	"Redcoats at the Farm and the Death of Thomas"	4:59
6.	"Ann Recruits the Parishioners"	3:09
7.	"Preparing For Battle"	5:50
8.	"Ann and Gabriel"	4:35
9.	"The First Ambush and Remembering the Wilderness"	4:00
10.	"Tavington's Trap"	4:10
11.	"Burning of the Plantation"	4:55
12.	"Facing the British Lines"	3:05
13.	"The Parish Church Aflame"	3:03
14.	"Susan Speaks"	3:17
15.	"Martin vs. Tavington"	3:06
16.	"Yorktown and the Return Home"	5:20
17.	"The Patriot (Reprise)"	7:50

For those interested in hearing the score in chronological order, the order is (roughly) 2, 3, 5, 9, 6, 12, 8, 11, 14, 13, 10, 4, 7, 15, 16, 17.

== Use in Politics ==
- A portion of the music from The Patriot was played after Barack Obama's victory speech as President-elect of the United States on November 4, 2008.

== Use in Television ==
- Excerpts of the song The Colonial Cause were remixed and utilized for the opening credits theme song for the shortlived 2004-2005 television series Jack and Bobby which aired on The WB. The song was played over audio clips of various United States Presidents, and was synchronized with images of the same presidents. Coincidentally, the series starred Logan Lerman, who had portrayed the role of William Martin in The Patriot, which had been the actor's first role.
