= The Imperial March =

Musical theme from the Star Wars franchise

Single by John Williams

from the album The Empire Strikes Back
- Released: April 29, 1980
- Genre: Film soundtrack
- Label: RSO Records
- Songwriter: John Williams

Audio sample
- From The Empire Strikes Back (Finale): file; help

"The Imperial March (Darth Vader's Theme)" is a musical theme present in the Star Wars franchise. It was composed by John Williams for the film The Empire Strikes Back. Together with "Yoda's Theme", "The Imperial March" premiered on April 29, 1980, three weeks before the opening of the film, on the occasion of John Williams' first concert as official conductor-in-residence of the Boston Pops Orchestra. One of the best known symphonic movie themes, it is used as a leitmotif throughout the Star Wars franchise.

== Use in Star Wars ==
"The Imperial March" is sometimes referred to simply as "Darth Vader's Theme." In the movies (except for the original Star Wars), the march is often played when Darth Vader appears. It is also played during Darth Sidious's arrival on the Death Star in Return of the Jedi, though it does segue into the Emperor's own theme as he appears.

=== Original trilogy ===
"The Imperial March" is first heard in The Empire Strikes Back in low piccolos as the Galactic Empire sends probe droids across the galaxy in search of Luke Skywalker. Its major opening occurs as Imperial-class Star Destroyers amass and Darth Vader is first presented in the film, 19 minutes into the running time. The theme and related motifs are also incorporated into tracks such as "The Battle of Hoth" during the eponymous battle, "The Asteroid Field" during the chase sequence involving the Millennium Falcon, and "The Clash of Lightsabers" during Luke and Vader's duel on Cloud City over Bespin. Return of the Jedi makes similar use of the theme, though its final statement is significantly different, making quiet use of a harp as a redeemed Anakin Skywalker dies in his son's arms.

=== Prequel trilogy ===
"The Imperial March" is used several times in the prequel trilogy, most often used to foreshadow Anakin Skywalker's future as Darth Vader. An innocent theme for the nine-year-old Anakin in The Phantom Menace at 1H10 is thematically based on "The Imperial March." "The Imperial March" is also heard towards the end, as Yoda acknowledges Anakin as Obi-Wan's apprentice in saying "The Chosen One, the boy may be. Nevertheless, grave danger I fear in his training" at 2H06. It is also heard softly at the end of the final credit roll, where it fades into the character's signature breathing, showing that the rest of the prequel trilogy will reveal how Anakin became Darth Vader. In the second prequel, Attack of the Clones, "The Imperial March" is sometimes played subtly when an event foreshadows Anakin's future: It is first played when Yoda senses Anakin slaughtering a tribe of Tusken Raiders to avenge his mother's death and later with more force when Anakin tells Padmé Amidala what he did. It is played most prominently and recognizably during the final sequence when clone troopers assemble and depart Coruscant, foreshadowing the end of the Republic. Although "Across the Stars" is featured most prominently in the film's end credits, several notes from "The Imperial March" are heard beneath it near the end.

In Revenge of the Sith "The Imperial March" is first played when Anakin rebukes the Jedi Council for denying him the rank of Jedi Master, although appointing him to the Council at 0H37. The track can also be heard when Anakin tells Mace Windu about Palpatine's true identity, Darth Sidious. It is later played when Anakin is dubbed as the Sith Darth Vader, shortly after the death of Mace Windu. "The Imperial March" is quoted when clone troopers find dead Wookiees on Kashyyyk and when Padmé confronts Anakin on Mustafar. A few notes of the "March" are played when Vader arrives on Mustafar to kill the Separatists. The piece is played more clearly during the "Battle of the Heroes" scene between Obi-Wan and Darth Vader at the movie's climax and in the simultaneous battle between Yoda and Sidious, as a rearrangement of the version heard in "The Clash of Lightsabers" from The Empire Strikes Back. It is also played when Darth Vader receives his armor at 2H06 and when he looks up at the first Death Star with Sidious at 2H11.

=== Sequel trilogy ===
In the 2015 Star Wars: The Force Awakens, two bars from the brass motif of "The Imperial March" are played after antagonist Kylo Ren regards the charred remains of Darth Vader's helmet, vowing to finally succeed where the Galactic Empire failed. In the 2017 Star Wars: The Last Jedi, the track was briefly played after Supreme Leader Snoke compares antagonist Kylo Ren to Darth Vader, saying he saw the potential of "A new Vader." In the 2019 Star Wars: The Rise of Skywalker the track is present in the scenes where the mask of Darth Vader is shown, when Darth Sidious first reveals the Final Order, a massive armada of Xyston-class Star Destroyers built by the Sith Eternal, to Kylo Ren, when Rey seeks Sidious' Sith wayfinder in the Death Star's wreckage, and when a Sith Star Destroyer arrives to destroy Kijimi.

=== Star Wars Anthology ===
Trailers for Rogue One: A Star Wars Story featured the track prominently; the first notes of "The Imperial March" can be heard at the end of the trailer as the letters turn to reveal the name of the upcoming movie. Prior to this, Darth Vader can be heard breathing and his appearance is seen as a reflection on the floor. In the film proper, scored by Michael Giacchino, the theme can be heard when Vader emerges from his sanctum to confer with Director Orson Krennic, and again after Vader warns Krennic about overstepping his bounds. The theme can be heard once more when Vader attacks the Rebel soldiers trapped in a hallway; it is slowed down enough not to be obvious and joined with a chorus reminiscent of that from Revenge of the Sith. The theme is finally heard outright when Vader witnesses the Tantive IV fleeing into hyperspace.

The track appears early in Solo: A Star Wars Story during the battle of Mimban and then, transposed into a major key, as diegetic music in the Corellia spaceport as part of a commercial encouraging viewers to join the Imperial Navy, encouraging Han Solo to enlist as his ticket off the planet. This brief appearance marks the first and thus-far only in-universe appearance of "The Imperial March" in a theatrical film.

=== Star Wars: The Clone Wars ===
"The Imperial March" has influence in short but dark moments revolving around Anakin. For example, in episode 62, "Citadel Rescue", Anakin and Captain Wilhuff Tarkin both mention during their escape their good relationship with the Supreme Chancellor Palpatine. Anakin shakes hands with Tarkin at the end of the episode, while Tarkin says he will inform the Chancellor of Anakin's good performance. During that handshake, a hint is to be heard in the music referring to "The Imperial March." Other episodes that feature the theme include "Brain Invaders" (when Anakin strangles Poggle), "Voyage of Temptation" (when Anakin kills Merrik), "Overlords" (multiple times), "Ghosts of Mortis" (multiple times), "Kidnapped" (when Obi-Wan talks with Anakin and then Ahsoka), "Deception" (multiple times) and "Friends and Enemies" (multiple times), "Crisis on Naboo" (when Anakin argues with Obi-Wan), "The Lawless" (during Darth Sidious scenes), and "The Jedi Who Knew Too Much" (multiple times). The theme is used prominently during the sixth season.

=== Star Wars Rebels ===
In "Empire Day", the episode's title referring to the Empire's anniversary, "The Imperial Anthem" arrangement of "The Imperial March", is heard during the parade. The march is also heard in "Call to Action" when Grand Moff Tarkin arrives on Lothal, in the final scene of "Fire Across the Galaxy" when Darth Vader arrives on Lothal, and in multiple scenes in "The Siege of Lothal."

=== Obi-Wan Kenobi ===
In Obi-Wan Kenobi, the march is heard in "Part VI" after Darth Vader's contact with Darth Sidious.

== Uses outside Star Wars ==
- Rush Limbaugh used the composition for his "Gorbasm" updates on Mikhail Gorbachev.
- In January 2003, during Super Bowl XXXVII, ABC Sports took to using "The Imperial March" as a leitmotif for the Oakland Raiders.
- In 2012, Volkswagen released a commercial for Super Bowl XLVI, featuring several dogs barking to the tune of "The Imperial March."
- In September 2014, shortly before the Scottish independence referendum, a pro-independence campaigner rode a rickshaw alongside a group of anti-independence Labour politicians, who had travelled by train from London to Glasgow for a highly publicized visit, as they paraded through the center of the city, playing the Imperial March and announcing to Glaswegians: "Your Imperial Masters have arrived. Bow down before your Imperial Masters!"
- The main part of the composition can be heard during Asterix & Obelix: Mission Cleopatra.
- Protesters in US and Europe have played The Imperial March in coincidence with interventions by the police to cast it as belonging to the dark side.
- "The Imperial March" is briefly used in the Walt Disney Animation Studios feature film Ralph Breaks The Internet when Vanellope Von Schweetz runs away from First Order stormtroopers on OhMyDisney.com website.
- On 19 August 2024, a German Navy corvette, the Braunschweig, played "The Imperial March" as she was towed out of London.
- On The Simpsons, "The Imperial March" is used as a theme at times for Mr. Burns.

== Inspiration and influences ==
"The Imperial March" took inspiration and stylistic influences from Chopin's Marche funèbre and English composer Gustav Holst's Opus 32, The Planets, written between 1914 and 1917, and Grande Marche de Medjidie by August Ritter Von Adelburg.

== Certifications ==
Region	Certification	Certified units/sales
United States (RIAA)	Gold	500,000^{‡}
^{‡} Sales+streaming figures based on certification alone.

== See also ==
- "Duel of the Fates"
