= London Voices =

London-based choral ensemble

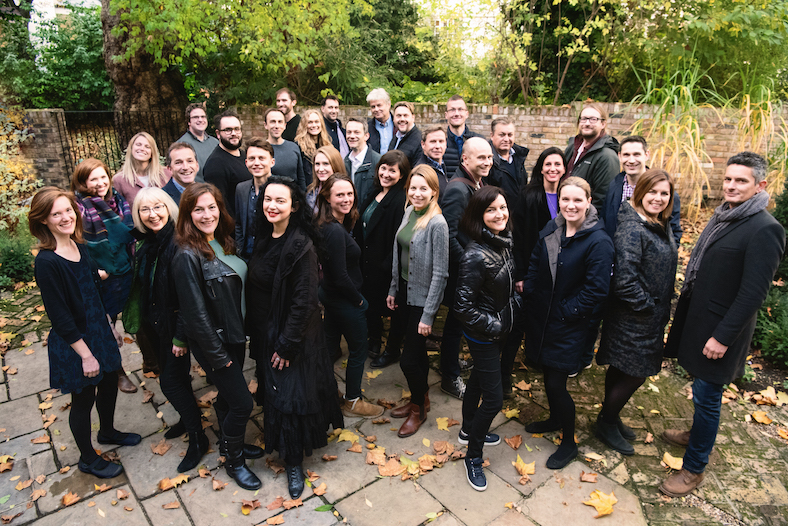

Background information
- Instruments: Choir
- Years active: 1973–present
- Members: Terry Edwards (founder); Ben Parry (director)
- Website: http://www.london-voices.com/

London Voices is a London-based choral ensemble founded by Terry Edwards (1939–2022) in 1973. In its early years, it also incorporated the London Opera Chorus and London Sinfonietta Voices and Chorus. In 2004, conductor and composer Ben Parry became co-director of the ensemble and in 2021 the Director and manager. Ben has held prestigious posts as artistic director of the National Youth Choirs of Great Britain, (2012–2023) and assistant director of Music at King's College, Cambridge (2013–2021). London Voices has been involved in many performances, recordings of operas and CD and film soundtracks, including The Hobbit, Hunger Games, the prequel trilogy of Star Wars, The Lord of the Rings and Harry Potter series, The Iron Lady, Enemy at the Gates, La traviata, and The Passion of the Christ. They have recorded with such diverse artists as Luciano Pavarotti, Dave Brubeck, Sir Paul McCartney, Jacob Collier, Queen, Deaf Havana, Sting, Renée Fleming, Bryn Terfel and Roger Waters and has performed in concert venues all over the world, including London, Aldeburgh, Birmingham, Liverpool, Leeds, Berlin, Paris, Munich, New York, Beijing, Shanghai, Jordan and Lucerne.

== Discography and Films ==
Selected film and/or other media soundtracks featuring London Voices: (for a full list of recordings see here)

- 2026 The Hunger Games: Sunrise on the Reaping (Howard, James Newton)
- 2026 Wildwood (Marianelli, Dario)
- 2026 Street Fighter (Birenberg, Leo - Robinson, Zach)
- 2026 Forgotten Island (David, Nathan Matthew)
- 2026 Coyote vs. Acme (Price, Steven)
- 2026 Supergirl (Sarne, Claudia)
- 2026 Masters of the Universe (Pemberton, Daniel)
- 2026 Swapped (Khosla, Siddhartha)
- 2026 Project Hail Mary (Pemberton, Daniel)
- 2025 David (Trapanese, Joseph)
- 2025 In Your Dreams (Debney, John)
- 2025 The Bad Guys 2 (Pemberton, Daniel)
- 2025 The Fantastic Four: First Steps (Giacchino, Michael)
- 2025 Jurassic World: Rebirth (Desplat, Alexandre)
- 2025 Mission Impossible: The Final Reckoning (Aruji, Max - Godfrey, Alfie)
- 2025 Snow White (Morrow, Geoff)
- 2025 Another Simple Favour (Shapiro, Theodore)
- 2025 Mickey 17 (Jae-il, Jung)
- 2025 Hamnet (Richter, Max)
- 2025 Dog Man (Howe, Tom)
- 2024 Nosferatu (Carolan, Robin)
- 2024 Mufasa: The Lion King (Metzger, Dave)
- 2024 Red One (Jackman, Henry)
- 2024 The Wild Robot (Bowers, Kris)
- 2024 The First Omen (Korven, Mark)
- 2024 Kung Fu Panda 4 (Zimmer, Hans – Mazzaro, Steve)
- 2023 Society of the Snow (Giacchino, Michael)
- 2023 Aquaman and the Lost Kingdom (Gregson-Williams, Rupert)
- 2023 Wish (Metzger, Dave)
- 2023 Trolls Band Together (Shapiro, Theodore)
- 2023 The Marvels (Karpman, Laura)
- 2023 Marvel's Spider-Man 2 (Paesano, John) (video game)
- 2023 Barbie (Ronson, Mark & Wyatt, Andrew)
- 2023 Miraculous: Ladybug & Cat Noir, The Movie (Zag, Jeremy)
- 2023 The Little Mermaid (Menkin, Alan)
- 2023 Guardians of the Galaxy Vol. 3 (Murphy, John)
- 2023 Star Wars Jedi: Survivor (Barton, Stephen – Haab, Gordy) (video game)
- 2022 Puss in Boots: The Last Wish (Pereira, Heitor)
- 2022 Guillermo del Toro's Pinocchio (Desplat, Alexandre)
- 2022 Werewolf by Night (Giacchino, Michael)
- 2022 Thor: Love and Thunder (Giacchino, Michael – Melumad, Nami)
- 2022 Jurassic World Dominion (Giacchino, Michael)
- 2022 Fantastic Beasts: The Secrets of Dumbledore (Howard, James Newton)
- 2021 Don't Look Up (Britell, Nicholas)
- 2021 The Boss Baby: Family Business (Zimmer, Hans – Mazzaro, Steve)
- 2021 The Elder Scrolls V: Skyrim (Soule, Jeremy)
- 2021 No Time To Die (Zimmer, Hans)
- 2021 The Suicide Squad (Murphy, John)
- 2021 Raya and the Last Dragon (Howard, James Newton)
- 2020 The Croods: A New Age (Mothersbaugh, Mark)
- 2020 Marvel's Spider-Man: Miles Morales (Paesano, John) (video game)
- 2020 Trolls: World Tour (Shapiro, Theodore)
- 2019 Abominable (Gregson-Williams, Rupert)
- 2019 Godzilla: King of the Monsters (McCreary, Bear)
- 2019 Avengers: Endgame (Silvestri, Alan)
- 2018 Aquaman (Gregson-Williams, Rupert)
- 2018 Marvel's Spider-Man (Paesano, John) (video game)
- 2018 Fantastic Beasts: The Crimes of Grindelwald (Howard, James Newton)
- 2018 Jurassic World: Fallen Kingdom (Giacchino, Michael)
- 2018 Avengers: Infinity War (Silvestri, Alan)
- 2017 Wonder Woman (Gregson-Williams, Rupert)
- 2017 Star Wars Battlefront II (Haab, Gordy) (video game)
- 2017 Thor: Ragnarok (Mothersbaugh, Mark)
- 2017 Captain Underpants: The First Epic Movie (Shapiro, Theodore)
- 2017 Beauty and the Beast (Menkin, Alan)
- 2017 Kong: Skull Island (Jackman, Henry)
- 2016 Fantastic Beasts and Where to Find Them (Howard, James Newton)
- 2016 Doctor Strange (Giacchino, Michael)
- 2016 Trolls (Beck, Christophe) (female choir only)
- 2015 Spectre (Newman, Thomas)
- 2014 The Hobbit: The Battle of the Five Armies (Shore, Howard)
- 2014 Exodus: Gods and Kings (Iglesias, Alberto)
- 2014 Maleficent (Howard, James Newton)
- 2014 The Grand Budapest Hotel (Desplat, Alexandre)
- 2013 Escape from Planet Earth (Zigman, Aaron)
- 2013 Hunger Games: Catching Fire (Howard, James Newton)
- 2013 The Hobbit: The Desolation Of Smaug (Shore, Howard)
- 2013 Byzantium (Navaratte, Javier)
- 2012 Rise of the Guardians (Desplat, Alexandre)
- 2012 Snow White and the Huntsman (Howard, James Newton)
- 2012 The Hobbit: An Unexpected Journey (Shore, Howard)
- 2012 Kinect Star Wars (Haab, Gordy - Newmaster, Kyle) (video game)
- 2012 The Hunger Games (Howard, James Newton)
- 2012 The Pirates! Band of Misfits (Shapiro, Theodore)
- 2011 Harry Potter and the Deathly Hallows: Part 2 (Desplat, Alexandre)
- 2011 Immortals (Morris, Trevor)
- 2011 Green Lantern (Howard, James Newton)
- 2011 The Iron Lady (Newman, Thomas)
- 2010 Harry Potter and the Deathly Hallows: Part 1 (Desplat, Alexandre)
- 2010 Iron Man 2 (Debney, John)
- 2009 A Christmas Carol (Silvestri, Alan)
- 2009 Harry Potter and the Half-Blood Prince (Hooper, Nicholas)
- 2008 Inkheart (Navarrete, Javier)
- 2008 Kung Fu Panda (Zimmer, Hans – Powell, John)
- 2007 The Golden Compass (Desplat, Alexandre)
- 2007 Harry Potter and the Order of the Phoenix (Hooper, Nicholas)
- 2005 Star Wars Episode III – Revenge of the Sith (Williams, John)
- 2004 Harry Potter and the Prisoner of Azkaban (Williams, John)
- 2004 The Passion of the Christ (Debney, John)
- 2003 Lord of the Rings: Return of the King (Shore, Howard)
- 2002 Harry Potter and the Chamber of Secrets (Williams, John)
- 2002 Lord of the Rings: The Two Towers (Shore, Howard)
- 2002 Star Wars Episode II – Attack of the Clones (Williams, John)
- 2001 Harry Potter and the Philosopher's Stone (Williams, John)
- 2001 Lord of the Rings: The Fellowship of the Ring (Shore, Howard)
- 2001 The Rat Race (Powell, John)
- 2001 Final Fantasy: The Spirits Within (Goldenthal, Elliot)
- 2000 Enemy at the Gates (Horner, James)
- 1999 Dogma (Shore, Howard)
- 1999 Star Wars Episode I – The Phantom Menace (Williams, John)
- 1999 Topsy Turvy (Gilbert & Sullivan)
- 1997 Looking for Richard (Shore, Howard)
- 1995 Judge Dredd (Silvestri, Alan)
- 1995 Cutthroat Island (Debney, John)
- 1994 Immortal Beloved (Beethoven, L.V.)
- 1989 The Cook, the Thief, His Wife & Her Lover (Nyman, Michael)
- 1986 The Mission (Morricone, Ennio)
- 1986 An American Tail (Horner, James)

Selected recordings by London Voices: (for a full list of recordings see here)

- Renée Fleming – I Want Magic! James Levine (1998) Decca 460567
- Igor Stravinsky – Vol. XI: Violin Concerto/Ebony Concerto/The Flood Robert Craft (1998) Music Masters 67195
- Angela Gheorghiu & Roberto Alagna – Verdi per due Claudio Abbado EMI 56656
- Vanessa-Mae – Storm (1998) EMI 21800
- Gaetano Donizetti – Lucia di Lammermoor Charles Mackerras (1998) Sony 63174
- All That Jazz: The Best of Ute Lemper (1998) Decca 458931
- Michael Nyman and Damon Albarn – Ravenous (1999) Virgin 47126/EMI 22370
- Giacomo Puccini – Il Trittico Antonio Pappano (1999) EMI 56587
- György Ligeti – Le Grand Macabre (1999) Esa-Pekka Salonen EMI 55563
- Leonard Bernstein – Wonderful Town (1999 Studio Cast Album) Simon Rattle EMI 56753
- Felix Mendelssohn, Giuseppe Verdi - A Midsummer Night's Dream (1999) Decca 466098
- Tan Dun – 2000 Today (1999) Sony 61529
- Nigel Kennedy – Classic Kennedy Barry Wordsworth (2000) EMI 90407
- Lesley Garrett – Lesley Garrett (2000) BBC 51338
- Lesley Garrett – I Will Wait for You Michel Legrand, John Harle, Peter Robinson (2000) BBC 75605
- Leonard Bernstein – White House Cantata Kent Nagano (2000) DG 463448
- Renée Fleming – Renée Fleming Charles Mackerras Decca 467049
- Béla Bartók – The Miraculous Mandarin Neeme Järvi (2000) Chandos 9029
- Charles Ives – When the Moon Richard Bernas (2000) Decca 466841
- Georg Solti – United Nations 50th Anniversary Concert (Fidelio Act II Finale) Decca 448901
- Sofia Gubaydulina – Canticle of the Sun Mstislav Rostropovich (2001) EMI 57313
- Britten – Messiaen Choral Works (2001) Edwards Virgin 61916
- Angela Gheorghiu – Casta Diva Evelino Pidò (2001) EMI 571632
- Robert Alagna – French Arias Bertrand de Billy (2001) EMI 57012
- Elliot Goldenthal – Final Fantasy: The Spirits Within (2001) Sony 89697
- John Adams – El Niño Kent Nagano (2001) Nonesuch 79634
- Amy Grant – The Spirit of Christmas (2001) Hallmark 2001
- Roberto Alagna – Bel Canto Evelino Pidò (2001) EMI 57302
- Lesley Garrett – The Singer (2001) EMI 57403
- Ben Heppner – Airs Francais Myung-whun Chung (2001) DG 471372
- Benjamin Britten – Curlew River Neville Marriner (2001) Phillips 454469
- Salvadore Licitra – The Debut: E Lucevan le stelle Carlo Rizzi Sony 089923
- Denise Leigh, Jane Gilchrist – Operatunity Winners Paul Daniel EMI 57594
- Bryn Terfel – Bryn Terfel Sings Favourites Barry Wordsworth (2002)DG 474438
- Giuseppe Verdi – Il Trovatore Antonio Pappano (2002) EMI 57360
- Leoš Janáček – Jenůfa Bernard Haitink (2002) Erato 45330
- Queen – The Queen Symphony Tolga Kashif (2003) EMI
- Dave Brubeck – Classical Brubeck Russell Gloyd (2003) Telarc 80621
- Roberto Alagna – Nessun Dorma Mark Elder (2003) EMI 57627
- György Ligeti – The Ligeti Project IV: Hamburg Concerto/Double Concerto/Ramifications /The Requiem Jonathon Nott (2003) Teldec 88263
- Alain Amouyal – Frames for a Fairy Tale (2003) Adams Plateforme P2000
- Violaine Corradi – Cirque du Soleil: Varekai (2004) BMG 74321
- Luciano Berio – Sinfonia Peter Eötvös(2005) DG 4775380
- Paul McCartney – Ecce Cor Meum (2006) EMI 70424
- Jon Hopkins – Singularity (2018) Domino Records
- Coldplay – Everyday Life (2019) Parlophone
- Ozzy Osbourne – Ordinary Man (2020) Epic Records
