= Read More About It =

Original release
- Network: CBS
- Release: 1980 – 1999

Related
- CBS Cares

Read More About It is a public service announcement campaign created as a joint venture between CBS and the Library of Congress that ran from 1980 to 1999 on CBS. The campaign, which usually aired one at the end of a special primetime program, was famous for its opening title sequence, which originally showed a live action TV set which zoomed in using stop motion that used pages on the side flipping into either the celebrity of the program aired or just on-screen graphics, which was remade in 1990 using computer animation that used CGI for the pages on the side of the TV flipping to revolve to the celebrity/graphics. The spiel in each PSA talks about learning more about what happened in the program, the books the Library of Congress suggests, and that they can be found in their local library or bookstore. It ended with either the celebrity of the program or an announcer saying, "Visit them. They'll be happy to help you Read More About It."

Originally the theme music was composed by Keith Mansfield, but in 1983, "Moments of Courage" by composer Craig Palmer became the theme for the PSAs. Along with a remade intro came a new theme for the campaign which lasted for the 1990s. With the arrival of the internet came new resources to learn about the subject of the special or movie aired on CBS and other networks. Because of this, Read More About It was succeeded at the turn of the 21st century by the CBS Cares campaign, which like its predecessor usually airs at the end of either a movie (example: The Karen Carpenter Story) (until 2010) or a special program (example: The Grammy Awards or the Super Bowl) and focuses primarily on resources, online and print, to learn about the event or subject featured in the preceding program or community involvement.

CBS Storybreak was the only series to have regular book suggestions from the Library of Congress. The books suggested usually are related to the plots of the featured half-hour animated adaptations.

== See also ==
- CBS Cares, a currently running CBS PSA campaign
- The More You Know, a PSA campaign created by NBC and expanded throughout NBCUniversal
- One to Grow On, The More You Know 's predecessor on NBC
- Reading Is Fundamental, the oldest American literacy organization
- Book It!, a program run by Pizza Hut
