= WillCall =

- Industry: Music
- Founded: 2011
- Founders: Donnie Dinch, Julian Tescher, Patrick Tescher
- Headquarters: San Francisco, California, U.S.
- Area served: United States
- Key people: Donnie Dinch (CEO, Co-Founder); Patrick Tescher (Co-Founder); Julian Tescher (Co-Founder); K. Tighe (Chief Communications Officer); Lauren Kish (WOTS); Emmanuel Pozo (MOTS)
- Website: getwillcall.com

WillCall was a San Francisco-based startup company offering a mobile app for iPhone and Android devices that allowed users to gain admission to live concerts, tip artists, and purchase merchandise during a show. It was named one of the Hottest Startups of 2013 by Forbes. Since its inception, the company had become known for editorial curation, a UX driven product strategy, and social networking integration. It had been called "an Uber for nightlife — one that makes everything from attending shows to buying drinks and merchandise much easier," by TechCrunch.

== History ==
WillCall was founded by designer Donnie Dinch and developers Julian Tescher and Patrick Tescher in Seattle following a Startup Weekend. Dinch, the company’s CEO, has stated that the idea for WillCall occurred to the trio as they were discussing plans for another app, listening to the radio station KEXP-FM. The Shout Out Louds played an in-studio set, and Dinch was surprised that he hadn’t heard they were in town. This created a discussion on whether a lack of awareness about live concerts was an industry-wide problem that could be solved with mobile technology. In 2011, WillCall received $50,000 in seed funding from Dave McClure’s 500 Startups and relocated to San Francisco. The app first launched in February 2012 for San Francisco users on Apple devices. WillCall launched a way to RSVP to SXSW events in bulk in 2012, they have subsequently updated the app for SWSW 2013 and 2014. WillCall 2.0, released in July 2013, included a native Android offering.

As of August 2013, WillCall had raised more than $2.1 million in seed funding from high-profile music and tech investors including Sean Parker, Coran Capshaw, SV Angel, Oliver Jung, Garrett Camp, and Sam Shank.

In August 2014, WillCall was acquired by Ticketfly for an undisclosed sum. In March 2016, Ticketfly announced it would shut down WillCall, but use what it learned from WillCall to launch Ticketfly's concert discovery app.

== Description ==
WillCall curates a list of shows happening in San Francisco and New York City and allows users to purchase admission with just a few taps without having to go to the box office to buy tickets. Dinch has stated that his vision for WillCall is to create “a casual use case that facilitates people seeing a show as often as they go to a bar or a coffee shop.”
