= NBCI =

NBCI may refer to:

- National Bureau of Criminal Investigation, the detective branch of the Irish Garda (police)
- North Branch Correctional Institution, a prison in Maryland, USA
- NBC Interactive, a one-time web portal (nbci.com) operated by American television network NBC - Part of it was Xoom.com
