= Eventbrite =

American event management company

Eventbrite, Inc.
- Company type: Private
- Website type: Event organization, ticketing
- Traded as: NYSE: EB (2018–2026)
- Founded: 2006; 20 years ago in San Francisco, California, United States
- Headquarters: San Francisco, United States
- Area served: Worldwide
- Founders: Julia Hartz; Kevin Hartz; Renaud Visage
- Revenue: ▲US$326 million (2023)
- Employees: 866 (2023)
- Parent: Bending Spoons
- Website: eventbrite.com
- Current status: Active (subsidiary of Bending Spoons)

Eventbrite is an American live events marketplace and website. The service allows users to browse, create, and promote local events. Unlimited events of any size can be published on Eventbrite at no charge.

Launched in 2006 and headquartered in San Francisco, Eventbrite opened their first international office in the United Kingdom in 2012. The company has local offices in Nashville, London, Cork, Amsterdam, Dublin, Berlin, Melbourne, Mendoza, Madrid, and São Paulo.

The company went public on the New York Stock Exchange on September 20, 2018, under the ticker symbol "EB". It was acquired and taken private by Bending Spoons in 2026.

== History ==
Eventbrite was founded in 2006 by Kevin Hartz (executive chairman), Julia Hartz (CEO), and Renaud Visage (CTO). The company was the first major player in this market in the U.S.

Prior to his position at the company, Hartz was involved with PayPal and was the co-founder and CEO of Xoom Corporation, an international money transfer company. His wife Julia Hartz was raised in Santa Cruz, California. After studying broadcasting at Pepperdine University, she became a creative executive at FX Network in Los Angeles. Soon after the two became engaged, she moved to the Bay Area and helped co-found Eventbrite.

On March 18, 2011, Eventbrite raised $50 million in Series E Financing led by Tiger Global. On April 22, 2013, Eventbrite raised another $60 million in growth capital financing led by Tiger Global, and including T. Rowe Price. On March 13, 2014, Eventbrite raised a private equity round of $60 million, and on September 1, 2017, the company raised $134 million in a Series G funding round. This brought their total funding to $334 million. Previous funding involved firms including Sequoia Capital, DAG Ventures and Tenaya Capital.

In 2016, Julia became the CEO of Eventbrite, while Kevin took the role of executive chairman.

On February 16, 2016, Eventbrite purchased Queue Ticketing for an undisclosed sum, signaling their entry into live music as a focus area. In March 2017, Eventbrite purchased D.C.-based event tech startup Nvite for an undisclosed sum. On June 9, 2017, Eventbrite purchased Ticketfly from Pandora for $200 million. The acquisition was meant to strengthen Eventbrite's position in the live music market, but according to observers, executives were still struggling to integrate Ticketfly as of 2019.

In January 2017, Eventbrite acquired rival Dutch company Ticketscript.

In April 2018, Eventbrite acquired the Spanish ticketing service Ticketea, citing its events discovery platform and "robust ecosystem of third-party integrations" as being advantageous. Later that month, Eventbrite was subjected to criticism over an update to its merchants' agreement, which specified that the service had the right to attend and record footage of any aspect of an event for any purpose, and that event organizers were "responsible for obtaining, at your own cost, all third party permissions, clearances, and licenses necessary to secure Eventbrite the permissions and rights [to do so]." Following public backlash, Eventbrite chose to remove the passage entirely. The company stated that it wanted the option to "work with individual organizers to secure video and photos at their events for marketing and promotional purposes", but admitted that the clauses were too broadly-worded.

In August 2018, Picatic, a Vancouver-based ticketing and event registration platform, was acquired by Eventbrite.

In April 2020, during the coronavirus pandemic which was causing a drastic drop in in-person events, Eventbrite laid off around 45% of its employees, which at that point numbered between 1,000 and 1,100. Reportedly, online events had amounted to less than 10% of the company's revenue in 2019.

In November 2020, the company acquired ToneDen, a social media marketing service based in Los Angeles.

Between October 2023 and September 2024, the company explored a new pricing structure. Since September 2024, it is free to publish unlimited events of any size on Eventbrite.

On December 2, 2025, Eventbrite announced that it had entered into a definitive agreement to be taken private by Bending Spoons (the same company which acquired Meetup) in an all-cash transaction valued at approximately $500 million. Under the terms of the agreement, Eventbrite's shareholders will receive $4.50 per share, representing an 82% premium over its recent stock prices. The deal closed on March 10, 2026.

== Funding ==
On March 18, 2011, Eventbrite raised $50 million in Series E Financing led by Tiger Global. On April 22, 2013, Eventbrite raised another $60 million in growth capital financing led by Tiger Global, and including T. Rowe Price.

On August 23, 2018, the company filed for a $200 million IPO. The IPO priced at $23 per share on September 20, 2018, with the company raising approximately $230 million at a valuation of approximately $1.76 billion. The company's largest shareholder is Tiger Global Management with Sequoia Capital and the Hartzs also owning significant shares.

In 2019, Eventbrite laid off 8% of their workforce to cut costs amid worries of an economic downturn. It also planned to relocate about 30% of the remaining roles, including moving certain development roles to Spain and India from Argentina and the U.S. The company added it will relocate nearly all of the customer support and operations roles to locations outside the U.S.
