= Mziiki =

African music streaming application

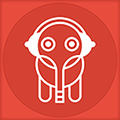
- Company type: Privately held company
- Available in: English
- Founded: 2014
- Headquarters: Nairobi, {{{location_country}}}
- Country of origin: South Africa
- Area served: 12 countries
- Founder: Arun Nagar
- CEO: Arun Nagar
- Key people: Vishal Rane(Regional Manager)
- Industry: Music
- Website: www.mziiki.com
- Registration: Required
- Users: N/A
- Launched: 2014
- Current status: Active
- Native clients on: Android, BlackBerry OS, iOS
- Written in: C++ (with some 3rd-party libraries)

Mziiki, meaning music in Swahili, is an African music streaming App launched in mid-2014 by Spice VAS Africa. Its library has content from over 1,500 African artists who have signed up. It can play streaming music or cache songs for offline playback. Music can be browsed or searched by artist, album, genre, playlist, or record label. Mziiki's brand partners/ambassadors were named in mid 2014 as Kevin Wyre, a Kenyan dancehall music veteran and BET Awards 2014 nominee Diamond Platnumz Mziiki also has a YouTube channel called mziikitube where it has compiled videos from its licenses artists

== See also ==
- List of Internet radio stations
- List of online music databases
- Music Genome Project
- TuneIn
