= Alan Braverman =

American businessman

Alan Michael Braverman
- Born: 1973 (age 52–53); Illinois, United States
- Education: University of Illinois at Urbana–Champaign (B.S. Computer Science)
- Occupation: Businessman

Alan Michael Braverman is an American businessman. He is co-founder and initial CTO of Xoom Corporation/Eventbrite with Kevin Hartz and Geni.com/Yammer with David O. Sacks. In 2014 Braverman worked on Sobo, "an audio version of Twitter"

Braverman's Giant Pixel was described in 2014 as "his San Francisco startup incubator." He is currently the co-founder and CEO of Textline, a business texting platform.

== Sobo ==
Sobo was an app for recording and distributing six-second sound snippets.

The New York Times quoted developer Alan Braverman as saying Sobo is "an audio version of Twitter." Braverman, who co-founded Yammer, was described in 2014 as a "Silicon Valley veteran" when Sobo debuted. It went from prototype to first public release in about three months.

The app was designed for use on iPhone and iPad.

== Education ==
Braverman graduated from University of Illinois at Urbana–Champaign in 1995 with a Bachelor of Science in Computer Science, where he worked on the Mosaic browser with Marc Andreessen.
