= Jon Kraft =

American business executive

- Born: Manhattan, New York City, New York
- Education: Stanford University (BA)
- Occupation: Business executive
- Years active: 1989-present
- Employer(s): Oracle Corporation, Stanford Technology Group, Pandora, CoreObjects Software, Big Stage Entertainment, Thrively, UberMedia, ExoDexa
- Known for: Co-founding Pandora

Jon Kraft is an American business executive and co-founder and former CEO of Pandora Media, Inc. He also co-founded Thrively, LiftOff, Big Stage Entertainment, and Stanford Technology Group. Kraft has worked for a number of technology companies including, Oracle Corporation, CoreObjects Software, Ubermedia, and Auryn, Inc. He currently serves as the Chairman of Thrively, managing partner of LiftOff LLC, and CEO of MuMo, Inc.

== Early life and education ==
Kraft grew up on the lower east side of Manhattan, in New York City.

He holds a Bachelor of Arts degree from Stanford University.

== Career ==
=== Oracle Corporation ===
From 1989 to 1992, he worked for Oracle Corporation as a Senior Technical Analyst.

=== Stanford Technology Group ===
In 1993, Kraft started his first company, Stanford Technology Group, which developed analytical software and consulted to Fortune 500 companies on the design and implementation of large database management systems. He served as its vice president until it was acquired by Informix Corporation in 1995. At Informix, Kraft served as the Director of Business Development and Product Marketing for two years.

=== Pandora Media ===
In 1999, Jon Kraft, along with Will Glaser and Tim Westergren, founded Pandora Media as Savage Beast Technologies in Oakland, California with the idea of The Music Genome Project. He served as its founding chief executive officer from 2000 to 2002. He, along with the other developers, patented the Music Genome Project: software that uses a mathematical algorithm to organize music and attempt to predict a person's musical taste based on a small musical sampling, This software is covered by United States Patent No. 7,003,515.

=== Since Pandora ===
In 2002, Kraft joined CoreObjects Software and served as the Senior Vice President, Sales and Marketing until 2005.

In 2006, he co-founded Big Stage Entertainment, along with Jonathan Strietzel and Jon Snoddy, and served as its Chief Operating Officer from 2006 and 2010. The company was named by Forbes, in 2009, as one of "America’s 20 Most Promising Companies."

In 2010, Kraft co-founded UberMedia, an independent developer of social mobile applications; and, from 2010 to 2012, he served as Chief Operating Officer.

In 2012, he co-founded Thrively.

In 2016, Kraft served as a member of the advisory board at MSM Corporation.

In 2023, he joined ExoDexa as Chief Strategy Officer and head of corporate development.
