= KXMZ =

Coordinates: 44.092°N 103.249°W

- Box Elder, South Dakota; United States
- Broadcast area: Rapid City, South Dakota
- Frequency: 102.7 MHz
- Branding: Hits 102.7

Programming
- Format: Hot adult contemporary

Ownership
- Owner: Houston Haugo; (Haugo Broadcasting, Inc.)

History
- First air date: March 12, 2008; 18 years ago

Technical information
- Licensing authority: FCC
- Facility ID: 164109
- Class: C2
- ERP: 50,000 watts
- HAAT: 137 meters (449 feet)

Links
- Public license information: Public file; LMS
- Webcast: Listen live
- Website: www.hits1027.com

KXMZ (102.7 FM, "Hits 102.7") is a radio station serving the city of Rapid City, South Dakota and owned by Houston Haugo, through licensee Haugo Broadcasting, Licensed to Box Elder, South Dakota, the station broadcasts a hot adult contemporary format.

The station became the subject of notoriety in June 2013, when the owners of the internet radio service Pandora announced a deal to purchase the station as a loophole in its disputes with music publishing societies over royalty payments. The deal was approved by the Federal Communications Commission on May 4, 2015, and was consummated on June 9, 2015. Pandora would later sell the station to Haugo Broadcasting in 2017.

== History ==
=== Purchase by Pandora ===
The internet radio service Pandora Radio had historically been in conflicts with ASCAP and BMI over increasing royalty rates for internet radio licenses relating to the service. Pandora had filed a lawsuit against ASCAP in November 2012, alleging that the collection society was charging Pandora higher royalty rates for internet radio than those negotiated by the Radio Music License Committee (a group of broadcasters which includes iHeartMedia, Inc., owners of the competing service iHeartRadio, along with Cumulus Media and CBS Radio), thus giving terrestrial radio broadcasters preferential treatment. Pandora also believed that it should also be charged lower rates directly from ASCAP because it had reached separate licensing deals with Sony/ATV Music Publishing and EMI Music Publishing.

On June 11, 2013, Pandora Media, the parent company of Pandora Radio, announced via a letter posted on the website of The Hill newspaper by Pandora's assistant general counsel, Christopher Harrison, that it would acquire KXMZ from Connoisseur Media for an undisclosed amount. The purchase of the station serves as both a strategic move and a publicity stunt; Pandora believed that acquiring a terrestrial radio station would allow the service to receive the same internet radio license that the Radio Music License Committee had negotiated, while drawing attention to the fact that broadcast radio stations do not need to pay such royalties. At the same time, Pandora also announced that it was filing a motion in a federal district court claiming that ASCAP was violating an antitrust consent decree issued by the Department of Justice. Alongside the preferential treatment of terrestrial radio companies, Pandora accused ASCAP of violating the decree by allowing its members to individually pull their content from its blanket license, but refusing to indicate which songs would be affected when re-negotiating with a company who did so, leaving Pandora liable for copyright infringement.

Pandora also stated that the acquisition would be used as a way to apply its music personalization insight (such as the Music Genome Project) to terrestrial radio; under its ownership, KXMZ was to broadcast music tailored to reflect local listening habits as gauged by the Pandora service, which the company claimed is used by over 42,000 users in the Rapid City market.

The move was criticized by David Israelite, CEO of the National Music Publishers Association, who declared that Pandora was now "at war with songwriters," and had lost its credibility because it was resorting to "lawsuits and gimmicks" to make its point. However, a member of Public Knowledge praised the move, by stating that it was "a perfect example of the twisted incentives and strange results we get from a music licensing system that is based on who wants a license instead of just what they want to do with the music they’re using."

==== Denial, appeal ====
The purchase application was filed to the FCC on June 20, 2013. The application includes a copy of the sale agreement indicating that Pandora will pay US$600,000 for the station, as well as a local marketing agreement showing that Pandora began operating the station on June 10. However, ASCAP filed a petition to deny the acquisition, arguing that the acquisition would not serve KXMZ's public service obligations because of Pandora's intent for the station as a "bargaining chip" for royalty payments, and also alleged that Pandora did not provide enough information about its ownership structure to prove that less than 25% of the company was owned by foreign interests. On January 14, 2014, the FCC said it was no longer processing the application, ruling that Pandora failed to "demonstrate adequate support for its foreign ownership compliance certification."

Pandora continued to pursue FCC approval, and on May 4, 2015, the FCC announced that it had approved the sale of KXMZ to Pandora, ruling that "it would serve the public interest to permit a widely dispersed group of shareholders to hold aggregate foreign ownership" above 25%. The purchase was consummated on June 9, 2015. Pandora would integrate aspects of the platform into the station's programming, including a daily chart countdown based on ratings given to songs by Pandora users in Rapid City, and a group of hyperlocal, genre-based stations on the platform. Pandora's ownership not have a major impact on the station's listenership, which stayed around a 4.0 share in the Nielsen Audio ratings during its tenure.

==== Sale to Haugo Broadcasting ====
Amid a declining stock price and a stake in the company being sold to SiriusXM, Pandora sold KXMZ to Haugo Broadcasting for $300,000 in June 2017. Haugo Broadcasting, based in Rapid City, also owns KSQY in Deadwood and KTOQ, KIQK, and K289AI in Rapid City.
