= Mark Universe =

MARK Universe
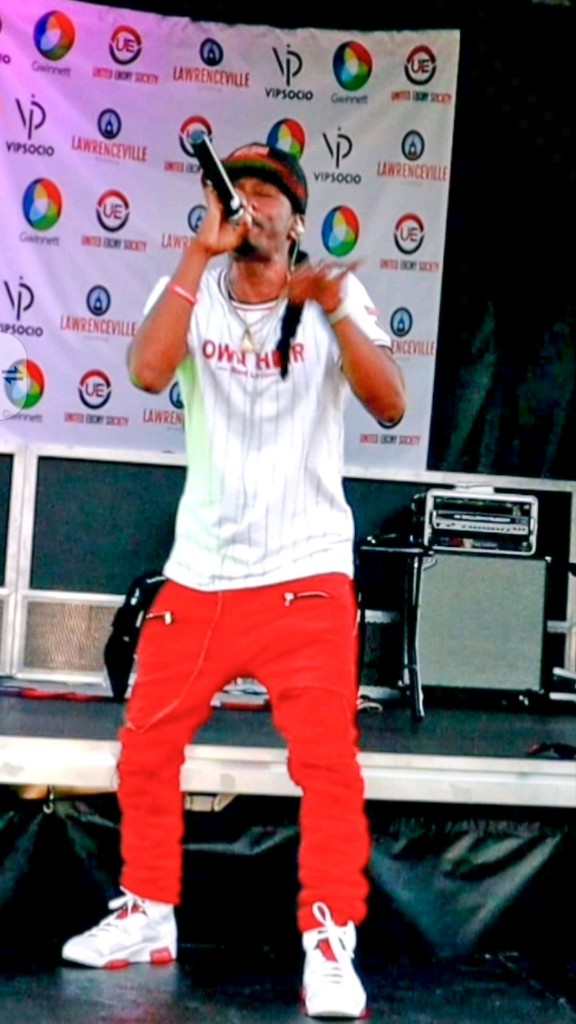

Background information
- Birth name: Daemar Montrez Williams
- Born: Mobile, Alabama
- Genres: Hip hop, Rap
- Occupation(s): Rapper, Producer, Songwriter
- Instrument(s): Vocals, Piano
- Labels: Own Heir Music LLC

Daemar Montrez Williams known professionally as MARK Universe, is an American songwriter, musician, and producer from Mobile, Alabama. In December 2017 he was a finalist in the IGNITE URBAN National Finals.

Williams founded the record label "Own Heir Music LLC" in 2012.

He has had over 1 million plays on Pandora. and was described as a promising artist on Billboard's Next Big Sound chart.

== Discography ==
=== Albums ===
- Ima Superstar EP
- Above and Beyond LP (2011)
- Tomorrow Starts Today LP (2017)
- Gold LP (2020)
- G.A.M.E.S 2021
- Ozone 2022

=== Singles ===
- Get Up (2017)
- Aint Tripping (2018)
- Play For Keeps (2018)
- Submarine (2018)
- Trust The Process (2018)
- Elbow Drop (This That) (2018)
- 1s and 0s Bleep Bloop (2020)
- high beaming and steaming (2020)
- Inspiration (2021)
- Brag on Him (2022)
- El Hombre (2022)
- I Trust God (2023)

== Filmography ==
- Own Heir: From Pain to Promise (Director, Writer, actor)

=== Video ===
- Think I'm Picky (2019)
- Port City (2019)
- Outta Space (2018)

== Awards and recognition ==
- Finalist in the Ignite Urban Music Competition
- Promising artist on "Next Big Sound"
