= CBS Cares =

Television public service announcement campaign

CBS Cares is a television public service announcement (PSA) campaign that usually feature performers from CBS Television Network programming. The PSAs have addressed numerous causes, including an array of health issues affecting a large portion of their target audience. Each year, close to 200 million Americans see one or more of the CBS Cares campaigns.

== Special broadcasts ==
In 2006, CBS Cares partnered with the Nelson Mandela Foundation to produce the first-ever Tolerance PSAs in which Zulu Nelson Mandela, in his own words, addressed the American audience. According to the foundation, Mr. Mandela chose CBS Cares for the strength of its messaging. These Nelson Mandela messages continue to air on CBS and have been seen in 82 countries around the world.

CBS Cares has produced campaigns to celebrate with ethnicities: Black History Month, Asian Pacific American Heritage Month, Hispanic Heritage Month, and Native American Heritage Month.

CBS Cares has also worked with the NAACP in developing PSAs to mark its 100th Anniversary. Additionally, it worked with the Martin Luther King Jr. Memorial Trust on PSAs to raise funds for the Martin Luther King Jr. Memorial in Washington, D.C.. CBS Cares annually marks the Martin Luther King Jr. holiday with PSAs featuring Congressman John Lewis, who marched with Dr. King.

CBS Cares annually marks Memorial Day and Veterans Day with special PSAs honoring American military veterans. Another set of PSAs honors the victims of the Nazi Holocaust. These run annually on International Holocaust Remembrance Day.

CBS Cares has marked the holiday season with special messages on important health issues. This humorous campaign promoted giving gifts of prostate exams and pap smears to loved ones. It was ranked 17th by the TV Guide Channel on its 2010 show, 25 Most Hilarious Holiday TV Moments.

== Relief efforts ==
When major natural disasters have struck, CBS Cares has often partnered with the American Red Cross to develop multimedia PSAs featuring numerous CBS talent to raise funds for disaster relief. Most recently, CBS Cares released several PSAs discussing how to help the victims of Hurricane Sandy and the Oklahoma Tornado. Viewers were urged to help those affected by donating $10 to the American Red Cross Disaster Relief via text message.

== Health issues ==
CBS Cares also undertook a project on depression. The fulcrum of this campaign were PSAs and an in-depth interview with 60 Minutes icon Mike Wallace on his personal struggle and triumph over depression. The depression campaign was followed by a series of PSAs on bipolar disorder, featuring NCIS star Mark Harmon.

CBS Cares also addressed the issue of postpartum depression in a series of PSAs featuring Cold Case star Kathryn Morris. A PSA was also created in Spanish and featured co-star Danny Pino. Postpartum Support International credited the CBS Cares campaign as one of the major factors in boosting awareness and helping women’s health advocates place postpartum on the national agenda.

CBS Cares discussed breast cancer during its awareness month: October. PSAs featuring Elisabeth Shue from CSI, Kaley Cuoco from The Big Bang Theory, and Alyson Hannigan from How I Met Your Mother encouraged viewers to learn the facts, including the benefits of early detection and the importance of mammograms in saving lives.

CBS Cares often uses humor to reinforce viewer engagement on serious underlying health issues, especially health issues that have been stigmatized. According to CBS, this strategy was developed in close consultation with medical experts, who were concerned about viewer tune-out to traditional health messages. These campaigns have won numerous awards, including four consecutive CINE Golden Eagle Awards, three Communicator Awards and a Gracie’s Award. CBS Cares has also won three consecutive Prism Awards, as well as the Paul Rogers Leadership Award and an award from the National Alliance on Mental Illness. In 2018, CBS Cares also received a Voice Award in LA from a coalition of the U.S. government's Substance Abuse and Mental Health Services Administration, the American Psychological Association, American Psychiatric Association, and various Hollywood unions for its campaigns against substance abuse and stigma surrounding depression and bipolar disorder.

The CBS Cares Colonoscopy Sweepstakes is believed to be the first-ever health-related sweepstakes campaign done by a network. The 2012 CBS Cares Colonoscopy Sweepstakes featured The Talk co-host Sharon Osbourne and her rock legend husband, Ozzy Osbourne, and offered a three day trip to New York with a stay at a hotel near Central Park as well as a free colonoscopy at the New York Presbyterian Hospital. It received widespread media exposure, including an article in French online publication 24matins, which argued that France should consider having a Colonoscopy Sweepstakes of its own. The campaign is also credited in a 2012 textbook for physicians as one of the key reasons colonoscopies have become more widely accepted in the U.S.

CBS Cares, the CBS Veterans' Network and sister division CBS News jointly produced the radio broadcast Combat Stress: Finding the Way Home. This special hour-long program, hosted by 60 Minutes correspondent Steve Kroft, explored the impact of post-traumatic stress on American veterans. It was produced by CBS Radio News and made available to its 550 affiliates to be broadcast over the Memorial Day Weekend.

== Super Bowl PSAs ==
For Super Bowl XLI, CBS Cares partnered with the NFL to create a PSA for Big Brothers Big Sisters of America which featured the coaches of the Super Bowl teams, Tony Dungy and Lovie Smith. In the PSA, Dungy and Smith discussed the similarities between mentoring and coaching and urged viewers to become a Big Brother or Big Sister.

During Super Bowl XLIV, CBS Cares partnered with the NFL and Harvard Medical School/Massachusetts General Hospital on a PSA about women’s heart disease. The PSA featured NFL Quarterback Mark Sanchez and included his actual heartbeat, which was recorded through a digital stethoscope. The PSA was discussed across a range of social media, with a leading women's sports fan site calling it their favorite Super Bowl ad in 2010.

For Super Bowl XLVII, CBS Cares partnered with the NFL and Wounded Warrior Project to honor America’s military men and women and their families. The PSA was featured twice during the broadcast and encouraged more than 100 million viewers to make a monetary contribution of $10 to Wounded Warriors via their cell phones.

For Super Bowl 50 CBS Cares aired PSA's featuring Tea Leoni and Tom Selleck for the "I Have a Dream Foundation", an organization viewed as highly effective in mentoring and providing tuition for children from low income communities.

For Super Bowl LIII, CBS Cares created a PSA in partnership Girls Inc. and the New York Giants. The PSA depicted a fictitious girls football team named the Milwaukee Macaroons scoring a touchdown against the New York Giants. This reinforced that, when girls unite, they can achieve even the seemingly impossible. Gayle King did the Voice-over. The PSA ended with the Macaroons, together with other girls, celebrating the win by shouting 'Girl Power!" The PSA was ranked as one of the 10 Best Super Bowl commercials by Paste Magazine.

== References in pop culture ==
CBS Cares PSAs have been widely parodied with references on Saturday Night Live, The Tonight Show, Chelsea Lately, Jimmy Kimmel Live, The Soup, The Wanda Sykes Show, and CBS's own The Late Late Show with Craig Ferguson. The CBS Cares Colonoscopy Sweepstakes has also been the subject of a question on Who Wants to Be a Millionaire?

== See also ==
- Read More About It, a PSA campaign created by a joint venture between CBS and the Library of Congress
- The More You Know, a PSA campaign created by NBC which has since expanded throughout NBCUniversal
