= HitBliss =

- Company type: Private
- Website type: Streaming media
- Founded: 2008; 18 years ago
- Headquarters: Lexington, Massachusetts, United States
- Founders: Sharon Peyer; Andrew Prihodko
- Website: www.hitbliss.com
- Current status: Defunct

HitBliss was an online service that consisted of two applications: HitBliss Earn and HitBliss Store. In HitBliss Earn, users opted in and selected targeted ads to consume on their own schedule. In exchange for their verified time and attention, users received payment. Earnings could be used to purchase entertainment (e.g., movies, TV episodes, and Pandora One Subscriptions) via the HitBliss Store application. Users could stream movies and TV shows in HitBliss application. The service is available to subscribers in the US, UK, Canada, and Australia, as well as other countries.

The company was based in Lexington, Massachusetts, USA and was founded in 2008 by Sharon Peyer and Andrew Prihodko. HitBliss was privately backed by Alpond Capital.

Formerly, it competed with Hulu and Netflix, but the company stated that their video on demand (VOD) application was an effort to prove the viability of the HitBliss earned-payment method. The HitBliss earned-payment method was positioned as an alternative to credit cards or PayPal so that consumers could purchase a variety of items, including apps, games, and music, with their earned cash. In September 2013, HitBliss announced an agreement with Pandora Music, which allowed HitBliss users to purchase $3.99/month Pandora One subscriptions with their earned-cash.

== Affiliation ==
HitBliss had deals with three film studios (Warner Bros., Paramount and Universal) as well as Starz to offer Hollywood movies in the DVD/transactional VOD window and EST TV episodes the day after they air.

== Discontinuation ==
On 6 May 2014, HitBliss wrote on their blog that the service will be suspended while post-beta preparations are completed. Users who had a current balance were given the option to redeem their account balance as an Amazon Gift Card that was applied toward movies or videos.
