= The More You Know =

American public service announcement campaign

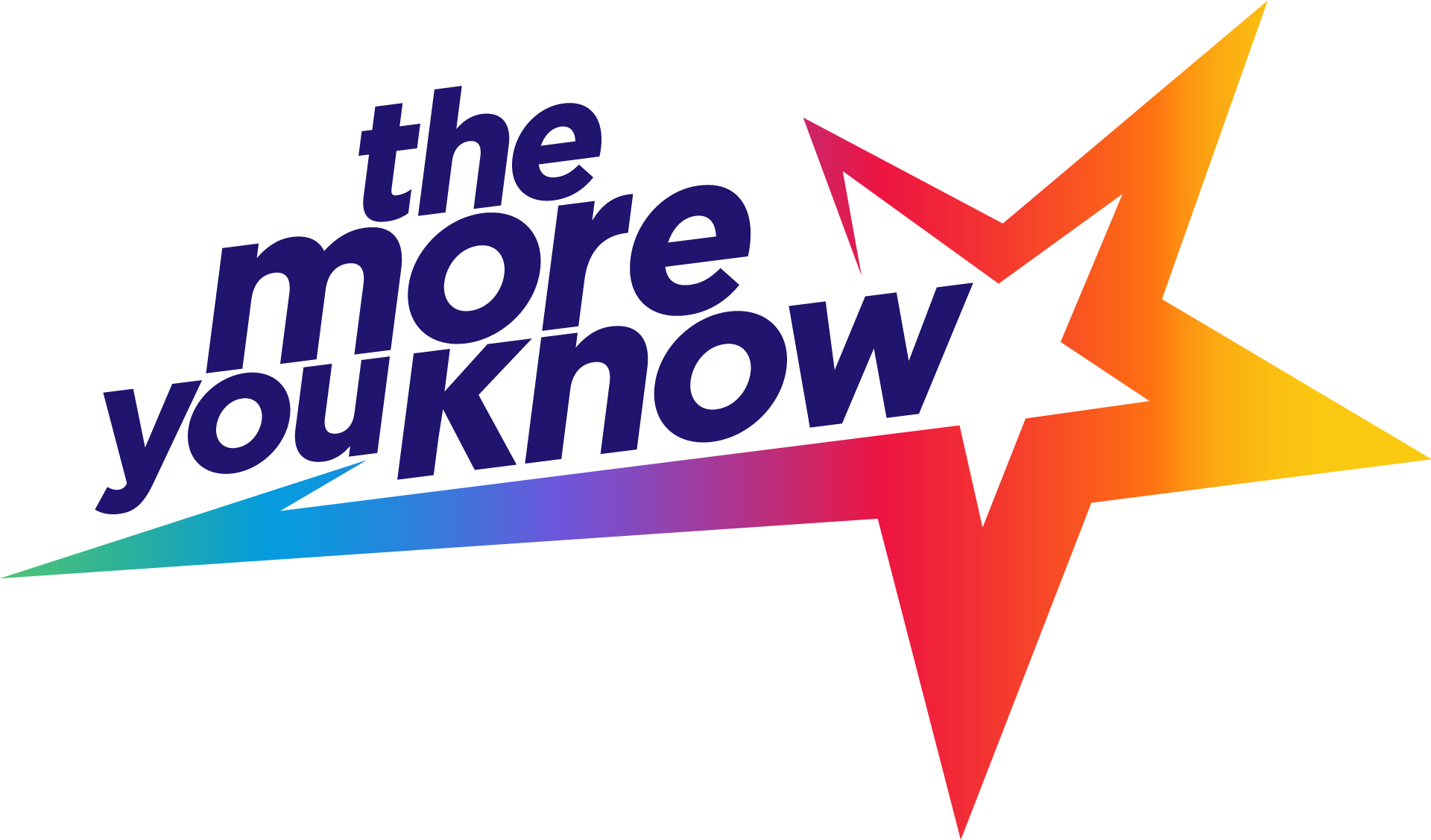
- Current logo as of 2023

Production
- Production company: NBCUniversal

Original release
- Network: NBCUniversal networks
- Release: September 9, 1989 – present

Related
- One to Grow On

The More You Know is a series of public service announcements (PSAs) broadcast on the NBCUniversal family of networks in the United States and other locations, featuring educational messages. These PSAs are broadcast occasionally during NBC's network programming.

The spots feature personalities from various NBC shows, as well as other notable figures such as U.S. Presidents. Tom Brokaw was the first person to do The More You Know spot; it aired on NBC in September 1989, succeeding the One to Grow On PSAs that were used from 1983 to 1989.

El Poder de Saber (The Power of Knowing) is The More You Know's sister campaign on Telemundo. While the other U.S. broadcast networks have similar campaigns, namely CBS Cares, Disney-ABC's Be Inspired, and PBS's Be More, NBC's The More You Know is likely the most well-known.

== History ==
A senior executive at NBC, Dr. Rosalyn Weinman, developed the campaign and wrote most of the on-air PSAs after putting an advisory council together. She ran the campaign for 10 years. The first "comet trail" star logo was designed by Steve Bernstein and later produced by Paul Johnson on an animation stand using a slit-scan technique at R/Greenberg Associates (now R/GA Digital Studios) in Manhattan. They were later updated using three-dimensional computer graphics. The More You Know program won a Peabody Award in 1993 for serving as "a model national public service campaign to provide a range of useful information to its vast television audience."

The campaign has featured a range of guests over the years, including Amy Poehler, Joan Rivers, Jack McBrayer, Steve Harvey, Anjelica Huston, Questlove, and Jimmy Fallon. Several past U.S. Presidents have also participated in the campaign, including George H. W. Bush and Barack Obama, who encouraged parents to be more involved in their children's education, while then-First Lady Michelle Obama worked to promote the prevention of childhood obesity. The show has also featured Jonathan Brandis.

On February 24, 2016, NBC announced that it would launch a new Saturday morning E/I block named after the campaign, programmed by Litton Entertainment and replacing its in-house NBC Kids block.

== Parodies ==
The campaign has been widely parodied, with references in Will & Grace, 30 Rock, American Dad!, Family Guy, Drawn Together, Scrubs, recurring parodies on Late Night with Conan O'Brien, a running segment on The Daily Show called "The Less You Know", and an April 2006 series of NBC-produced mock PSAs starring the cast of The Office. A sketch on Saturday Night Live portrayed the sometimes-fatal effects of CPR. A parody was also shown on MADtv, mentioning the "[nonexistent] danger of conga lines", and another one that spouted random obvious facts. Spliced has a parody of public-service announcements in general (and The More You Know in particular), in brief segments called "Knowing is Growing".

During the Super Bowl XLIX halftime show (which itself was broadcast by NBC), Katy Perry closed her performance with a rendition of "Firework" while riding on a shooting star; following the show, comparisons were drawn to the former logo of The More You Know, as captured by user-created edits of photos from the scene.

== See also ==
- The More You Know (TV programming block)
- CBS Cares, a currently running CBS PSA campaign
- Read More About It, a PSA campaign created by a joint venture between CBS and the Library of Congress
