= Jonathan I. Strietzel =

American entrepreneur, businessman and inventor

- Born: 1980 (age 45–46); United States
- Occupations: Entrepreneur, businessman, inventor
- Years active: 1997–present
- Known for: Telecommunications innovations and patent holder of ring-tone advertising

Jonathan I. Strietzel (born 1980) is an American entrepreneur, businessman, and inventor. He is known for founding various companies as well as engineering and patenting several systems and methods in telecommunications, advertising, and video gaming.

== Early life and education ==
Jonathan Streitzel completed a bachelor's degree in Business Administration at Chapman University.

== Career ==
In 1999 he invented systems for ring-tone advertising. He later invented one of the first storage business models. In 2001 he patented a Cloud computing system that constituted a cloud-based freemium online distribution model for music and films.

In 2005 he founded Clone Interactive alongside Jon Kraft and Jon Snoddy. The company later became New media firm Big Stage Entertainment and was named by Forbes as one of "America's 20 Most Promising Companies." In 2011 he founded Strietzel.Co, a software development company.

== Patent lawsuit ==
In 2011 a company called Callertone Innovations LLC filed 18 lawsuits against AT&T, Verizon, Sprint Nextel, MetroPCS, T-Mobile and others for breaching two patents on ring-tone advertising. The patents, titled "Method and apparatus for selectively providing messages in telecommunications systems", included patent Nos. 7,852,995 and 7,860,225. Jonathan Strietzel was registered as inventor of the patents in question.

== Patents ==
No.	Name	Inventor(s)	Publication No.	Publication date
1	Systems and Methods for Interactive Advertising Using Personalized Head Models	Jonathan Isaac Strietzel et al.	US 2009/0132371 A1	November 19, 2008
2	Systems and Methods for Voice Personalization of Video Content	Jonathan Isaac Strietzel, Jon Hayes Snoddy, Douglas Alexander Fidaleo	US 2012/0323581 A1	December 20, 2012
3	Systems and Methods for Distributing Targeted Multimedia Content and Advertising	Jonathan Isaac Strietzel	US 2009/0135177 A1	February 26, 2001
4	Method and Apparatus for Telecommunications Advertising	Jonathan Isaac Strietzel	US 2001/0051517 A1	January 2, 2001
5	Method and Apparatus for Selectively Providing Messages in Telecommunications Systems	Jonathan Isaac Strietzel	US 2009/0136010 A1	February 3, 2009
6	Systems and Methods for Creating Personalized Media Content having Multiple Content Layers	Jon Hayes Snoddy et al.	US 2009/0135176 A1	November 19, 2008
7	Systems and Methods for Server Based Video Gaming	Jon Hayes Snoddy et al.	US 2009/0135176 A1	November 19, 2008

== See also ==
- Jon Snoddy
