= Tim Westergren =

American entrepreneur (born 1965)

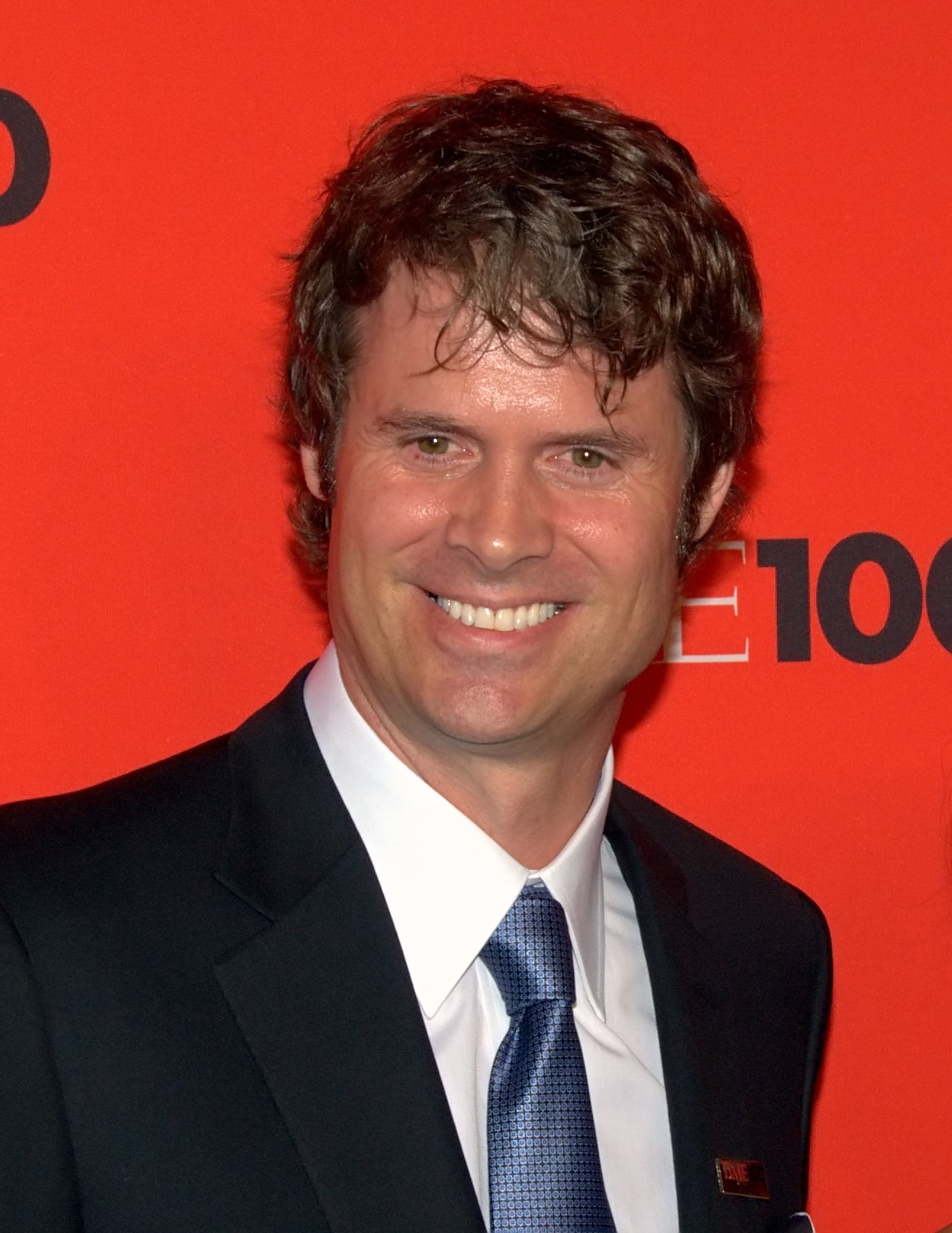
- Westergren in 2010
- Born: Timothy Brooks Westergren; December 21, 1965 (age 60); Minneapolis, Minnesota, U.S.
- Known for: Co-founder of Pandora

Signature
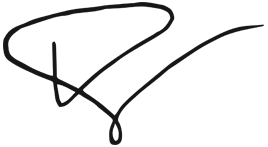

Timothy Brooks Westergren (born December 21, 1965) is an American record producer, composer, and entrepreneur known for being the co-founder of Pandora.

== Biography ==
Westergren was born in 1965 in Minneapolis. He attended boarding school, Cranbrook Kingswood, during his high school years. He graduated from Stanford University with a B.A. in political science. Following his graduation, Westergren spent twenty years working as a record producer and composer (working as a nanny in between jobs), devoting the majority of his time to emerging artists and independent labels.

In 1999 he started Pandora Media along with co-founders Will Glaser and Jon Kraft. The Oakland, Calif., company went public in 2010,

As an early project, Westergren and Glaser created the Music Genome Project, a mathematical algorithm to organize music. As the company's chief strategy officer, Westergren spent the majority of his time traveling the nation and gathering feedback from Pandora Radio users. In 2010 he was listed by Time magazine as one of the 100 most influential people in the world.

In April 2016, Pandora Media announced that Westergren would replace Brian McAndrews as CEO. He had been CEO and president from May 2002 to July 2004.
