= Picatic =

Online ticketing company

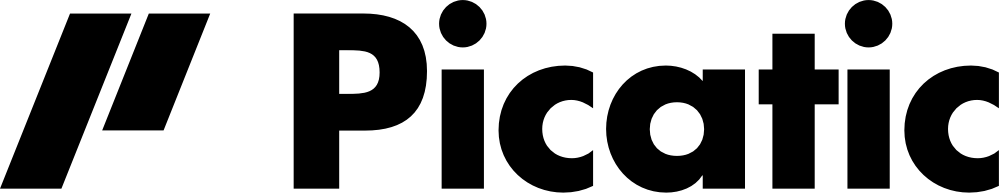
- Type: Private
- Industry: Event ticket sales
- Founded: 2008
- Fate: acquired by Eventbrite
- Headquarters: Vancouver, Canada
- Key people: Jayesh Parmar, Brett Ede
- Parent: Eventbrite
- Website: http://www.picatic.com

Picatic was an online ticketing company. Picatic's crowd-funding platform for event ticket sales allowed promoters to create event pages to generate funding before events are booked. Picatic is known for creating ticketing and registration solutions specifically within the events industry.

Jayesh Parmar founded Picatic in 2008. The company has offices in Toronto, Saskatoon, San Francisco, and New York City. In August 2018, Picatic was acquired by Eventbrite, a global ticketing and event technology company based in San Francisco.

== History ==
Jayesh Parmar is the CEO and co-founder of Picatic. Founded in 2008, the company started as a traditional online ticketing company. The first website was launched in 2009. Online ticketing services are a foundation of the company. Picatic allows events and venues to create, promote, and sell tickets for a variety of events.

In September 2012, Picatic launched their event crowdfunding feature, which has since been discontinued.

Picatic currently serves American, Canadian, European, Australian, United Kingdom, Swedish, Swiss and Danish markets. The company plans to expand services to Brazil, Hong Kong, Japan, Mexico, New Zealand, Norway and Singapore markets in 2018.

By August 2018, Jayesh Parmar announced in a press release that Picatic was acquired by Eventbrite.

== Products ==
Picatic offers two primary services. The company provides online ticket sales. Picatic charges vendors a commission on for-profit tickets. The company does not charge for free tickets.

Picatic's API provides developers with the framework to build registration and ticketing into their own apps.

Additionally, Picatic offers tools to supplement event planning. These include an app to monitor inventory or attendance lists from mobile devices, widgets to embed on company or individual webpages, online guest surveys, and others. Picatic also provides back-end management tools which allow planners to manage all aspects of an event from one location. Event planners are able to receive daily or weekly sales reports, manage tickets and refunds, email guests through the Picatic website, and provide updates.

The company has been called “the Kickstarter of events” in the past, though now focuses entirely on its ticketing platform having removed its crowdfunding feature in 2015.

== Recognition ==
Picatic unwittingly provided the punch line for an Internet sensation in 2012. Lisa Dutton, an anchorwoman for a local news show in Saskatoon, mispronounced the company name during a broadcast. Dutton told viewers that tickets for a sausage-eating contest could be purchased at “picadick”. This video went viral. Picatic reported a large spike in Internet traffic to the website following this event.

In 2012, Extreme Startups selected Picatic as one of five start-ups to receive funding and support. As part of this cohort, Picatic receives seed money, mentorship and administrative and legal support for one year.

Follow Extreme Startups, Picatic was selected to join the General Assembly at the CTA@NYC in order to further expand their brand and business.
