= Julia Hartz =

American entrepreneur

Julia D. Hartz
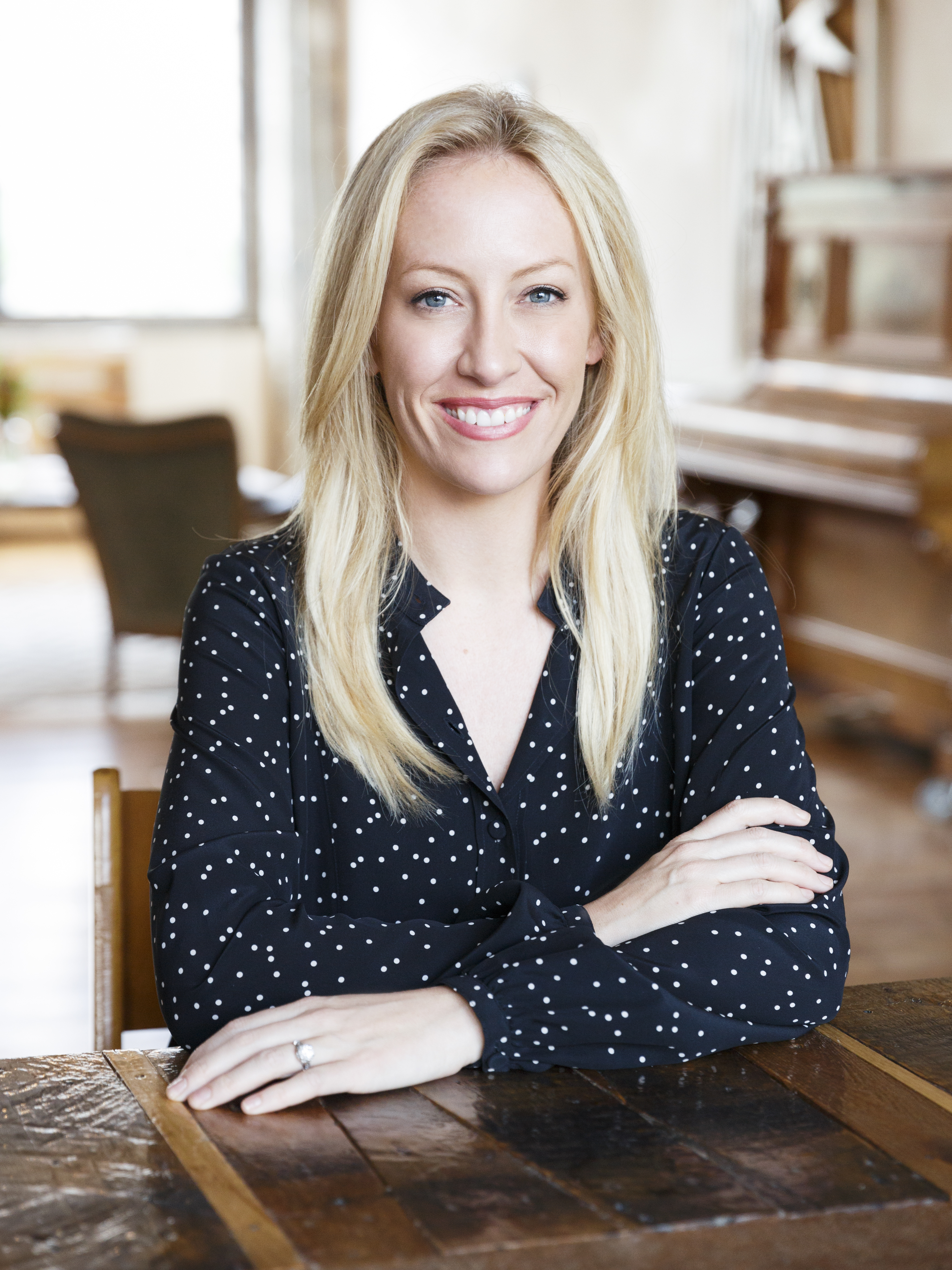
- Born: November 20, 1979 (age 46); Santa Cruz, California, US
- Education: Pepperdine University (BA)
- Occupation: Entrepreneur
- Years active: 2001 - present
- Title: Co-founder & Former CEO, Eventbrite
- Spouse: Kevin Hartz
- Children: 4

Julia Hartz (November 20, 1979) is an American entrepreneur, investor, and the co-founder and former CEO of Eventbrite, a global ticketing and event technology platform. She is known for her leadership of Eventbrite during the COVID-19 pandemic and empowering women in the technology industry. Hartz was selected as one of Fortune magazine's most powerful women entrepreneurs.

== Career ==
Hartz was born and raised in Santa Cruz, California. She graduated from Pepperdine University in 2001 with a Bachelor of Arts in Telecommunication.

Hartz began her career as a development executive at MTV where she contributed to the Jackass TV series from 2001 to 2003. At FX Networks from 2003 to 2005, she helped oversee shows including The Shield, Rescue Me, Nip/Tuck and 30 Days.

In 2006, she co-founded Eventbrite with (her then-fiancé) Kevin Hartz and Renaud Visage. The company now has more than 700 global employees with offices in 12 countries.

In April 2016, Hartz was appointed CEO and became member of Eventbrite Board of directors after her husband (and co-founder) stepped down from the role. In September 2018, Hartz took the company public, "making her among the few women to lead the successful initial public offering of a technology start-up."

Outside of Eventbrite, Hartz is an investor in Minted, Chairish, Playa Capital Company, Tamara Mellon and Color Genomics. She serves on the Board of directors of the Four Seasons Hotels and Resorts, and University of California, San Francisco’s Board of overseers.

== Recognition ==
Hartz has been honored twice as one of Fortune magazine’s 40 Under 40 business leaders, Inc.’s 35 under 35, and one of Fortune's most powerful women entrepreneurs. The Aspen Institute also recognized Hartz as one of the 2018 Class of Henry Crown Fellows.

In 2014, Hartz appeared on the cover of Forbes Magazine in a feature of Sequoia Capital’s founding stars. She often speaks on the subject of building and scaling a global business, entrepreneurship, and the power of human connection through live experiences.

== Personal life ==
Hartz got engaged to Kevin Hartz in April 2005, "started Eventbrite nine months later, and got married five months after that." In 2016, after Hartz took over the CEO role, her husband Kevin returned to working as an investor. Hartz lives in San Francisco with her husband and four daughters.
