= Kevin Hartz =

American entrepreneur and investor

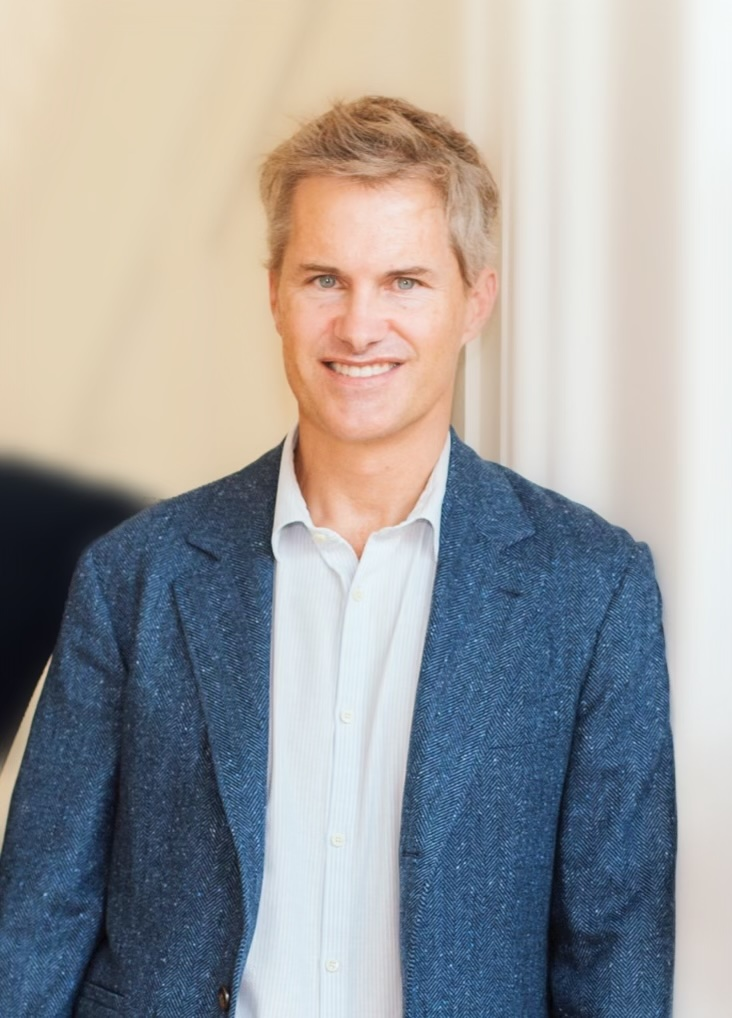
- Born: Berkeley, California, U.S.
- Education: Stanford University (B.A.S.); University College, Oxford (M.St.)
- Occupation: Businessman
- Known for: Co-founder of Xoom; Co-founder of Eventbrite; Co-founder of A*
- Spouse: Julia Hartz

Kevin Hartz is an American businessman and investor in the technology industry. He is the co-founder of Xoom and was the CEO from 2001 to 2005. Hartz co-founded Eventbrite along with his wife and Renaud Visage in 2006. He is a co-founder and general partner of A*, a venture capital firm, and a co-founder and chairman of Sauron, a company providing home security system solutions.

== Biography ==
Hartz was born in Berkeley, California, and raised in Orinda, California. He earned a Bachelor of Arts and Science in history and applied earth science from Stanford University, as well as a Master of Studies in British history from University College, Oxford.

== Career ==
Hartz began his career at Silicon Graphics (SGI) as the product manager for the virtual reality browser, Cosmo Player.

In 2001, Hartz co-founded Xoom, an international money remittance business, along with Alan Braverman. He served first as CEO until 2005, and then on the board of directors through its February 2013 IPO and subsequent acquisition by PayPal in 2015. The company had a total equity value of $1.1 billion at that time.

In 2006, Hartz co-founded Eventbrite, the global self-service ticketing platform, along with his wife, Julia Hartz and Renaud Visage. Hartz served as Eventbrite's chief executive until 2016, when Julia Hartz succeeded him and he became executive chairman.

Hartz joined Founders Fund in September 2016 and served as a partner. He later announced his exit from the company in June 2018. He remained on Eventbrite's board until June 2024, when he did not stand for re-election.

In 2020, Hartz co-founded venture firm A*, where he serves as a general partner.

== Personal life ==
Hartz lives in San Francisco with his wife, Julia Hartz, and they have two daughters.
