= Ticketscript =

ticketscript
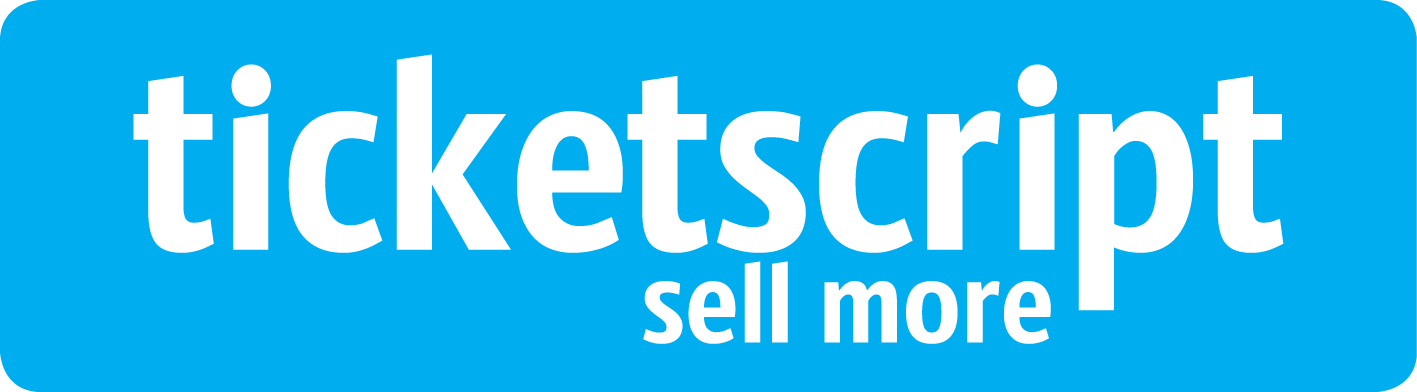
- Industry: Computer software, ticketing, Events, Event Management
- Founded: 2006
- Founders: Frans Jonker, Ruben Meiland
- Number of locations: Amsterdam, Berlin, London, Barcelona, Antwerp
- Key people: Frans Jonker (Co-founder & CEO); Ruben Meiland (Co-founder & CPO); Jason Thomas (CCO); Mark Stork (CFO); Matt Ephgrave
- Products: Ticketshops; Dashboard; Box Office; Flow App; Client Services
- Website: www.ticketscript.com

Ticketscript is a European self-service event ticketing company that was established in 2006 in Amsterdam, Netherlands by Frans Jonker and Ruben Meiland. The company wrote software which enabled the event organisers to design events, sell event tickets via the websites, as well as admit people and record event data. Prior to being acquired, ticketscript was active in the United Kingdom, Germany, the Netherlands, Spain and Belgium.

The company was established in 2006 Amsterdam, The Netherlands, by Frans Jonker and Ruben Meiland. They had offices in five European cities including London, Berlin, Barcelona and Antwerp and employed over 150 people across five countries. The offices in Germany and Belgium were opened in 2009, the London office in 2010 and the Spanish one in 2011.

The company was acquired by Eventbrite in January 2017.

== Products ==
ticketscript provided software for ticket creation, ticket sales and event management. Their Flow app allowed people to manage guestlists and entrance.

== Investment ==
The company went through various rounds of investment funding, with the first round taking place in 2010. In 2014, London-based private equity firm, FF&P, invested £7m in the company, which enabled ticketscript to continue its international expansion and development of new products and features.
