= Xoom (web hosting) =

Defunct free unlimited-space web hosting site

Xoom was an early dot-com company that provided free unlimited space web hosting, similar to GeoCities. The domain "xoom.com" is now held by the Xoom Corporation, an international-focused money transfer website run by PayPal.

== History ==
Xoom was founded by Chris Kitze in September 1996 as a download website offering free clipart and a productivity suite including a word-processing application, centering on a word processor based on WordStar.

In March 1997, Xoom became a web hosting (offering 100 MB) and an e-mail hosting website. The company acquired several small service providers in 1997 and 1998, including Paralogic, creator of ParaChat, which was the largest chat network on the web at the time, and PageCount, a web counter service. The main revenue sources for the company were direct marketing via email to members and banner advertising.

== Funding ==
The company was funded by a former Lycos executive who had previously started Creative Multimedia (Portland, OR), Aris Multimedia (Marina del Rey, CA) and Point Communications (New York, NY), and angel investors who invested a total of $10M in common stock. No venture capital was raised and the company went public in December 1998 (ticker symbol: XMCM). Around that time, it was ranked as the 13th most popular site on the web by Media Metrix. In May 1999, a deal was announced to use Xoom.com as a vehicle for NBC's internet ventures, that combined Snap.com (owned by CNET and NBC), and various NBC internet assets plus $400M of NBC on-air promotion to form NBC Internet (NBCi). At that time, the combined entity was ranked as the 7th most popular site on the web by Media Metrix.

== Reception ==
Xoom was both criticized and praised for its strict policies on violations of terms of service. A short-lived experiment in franchising and licensing the Xoom software platform and business model in 1998 led to an Italian website, xoom.it, which is still in operation and owned by Virgilio.
