= One to Grow On =

American public service announcement campaign

- Kim Fields on One to Grow On
- Starring: (Partial list); Byron Allen; Jason Bateman; Justine Bateman; Kristine Blackburn; Tempestt Bledsoe; Thom Bray; Todd Bridges; René Enríquez; Kim Fields; Michael J. Fox; Soleil Moon Frye; Michael Gross; Estelle Getty; Kadeem Hardison; Valerie Harper; Jackee Harry; David Hasselhoff; Joel Higgins; Cherie Johnson; Perry King; Michael Landon; Nancy McKeon; Richard Moll; Mr. T Sarah Purcell; Charlotte Rae; Alphonso Ribeiro; Rick Schroder; Dwight Schultz; Michael Talbott; Malcolm-Jamal Warner; Lisa Whelchel; Betty White; Jaleel White; Tina Yothers
- Country of origin: United States

Production
- Camera setup: Single-camera
- Running time: 60–90 seconds

Original release
- Network: NBC
- Release: September 17, 1983 – September 2, 1989

One to Grow On is an educational public service announcement that broadcast during NBC's Saturday morning line-up from 1983 to 1989, when the network ran cartoons. The name is taken from the custom of putting an extra candle on a birthday cake as "one to grow on". One to Grow On focused on ethical and personal safety dilemmas and attempted to teach viewers how to solve them. The public service announcement appeared immediately after the end credits of NBC cartoons, such as ABC did with Schoolhouse Rock! and CBS with In the News.

The public service announcements began with an animated sequence that leads into an animated TV on which an actor appears. After the actors introduced themselves (which, until 1986, was followed by a 30-second commercial), live-action sequences followed, in which a child faced an ethical dilemma. One to Grow On then cut back to the actor, who explained to the viewer how to solve the problem. The child then either had to own up to the consequences of the action or make an effort to rectify the situation. The actor ended the segment by saying, "And that's One to Grow On."

One to Grow On received an Emmy Award in 1987. The programming segment was replaced by The More You Know in September 1989.

== Segment hosts ==
The segments were hosted by the stars of NBC primetime series, including from:

- 227: Marla Gibbs and Jackée Harry
- A Different World: Kadeem Hardison
- Amazing Stories: Kristine Blackburn
- Diff'rent Strokes: Todd Bridges
- Family Ties: Michael J. Fox, Michael Gross, Justine Bateman and Tina Yothers
- Highway to Heaven: Michael Landon
- Knight Rider: David Hasselhoff
- Miami Vice: Michael Talbott
- Night Court: Richard Moll
- Punky Brewster: Soleil Moon Frye and Cherie Johnson
- Real People: Byron Allen and Sarah Purcell
- Riptide: Perry King and Thom Bray
- Silver Spoons: Rick Schroder, Alfonso Ribeiro, Erin Gray and Joel Higgins
- The A-Team: Mr. T and Dwight Schultz
- The Cosby Show: Malcolm-Jamal Warner and Tempestt Bledsoe
- The Facts of Life: Kim Fields, Nancy McKeon, Lisa Whelchel and Charlotte Rae
- The Golden Girls: Estelle Getty and Betty White
- Valerie: Valerie Harper and Jason Bateman

Many of the celebrities featured were from NBC prime time programs that kids had been familiar with, parents being comfortable enough to allow kids to watch these programs, however, René Enríquez from the adult-oriented prime time show Hill Street Blues also hosted a segment specifically on how children should not be watching the show since it was broadcast too late, past a typical child's bedtime on a school night, as well as briefly evaluating it's more mature dramatic content compared to the other NBC programs. Another special move was when pro athlete Ozzie Smith hosted a segment which revolved around the issue of usage of snuff, where Smith explained in his segment that he is not a user of snuff and it has nothing to do at all with baseball playing ability or the "image of the big leagues", and then-First Lady Nancy Reagan likewise hosted a 1986 segment encouraging kids to "Just Say No" to drugs and alcohol. A few segments featured a young Jaleel White as one of the child actors.
