= Oliver Jung =

German-born Israeli entrepreneur

Oliver Jung (born 1972 in Germany) is an entrepreneur and investor based in Tel Aviv, Israel, specializing in the global expansion of Internet and mobile enterprises in the early stages of development.

== Early life and education ==
Jung was born in Heidelberg, Germany, in 1972, and spent most of his childhood in Hockenheim in southern Germany. He later moved to Karlsruhe, in 1992, to pursue a degree in computer science at the University of Karlsruhe (TH). It was during his studies in Karlsruhe that Jung became interested in Internet technologies, and is today involved in many companies around the world as a founder, consultant and investor. Currently, Jung serves as partner at jungmiropolski (jungmiro.com), Investment Manager at Adinvest AG and chief executive officer at Awari Capital GmbH.

== Career ==
Jung founded his first company in 1997, the eCommerce consulting company Entory AG. The company was sold to Deutsche Boerse Group – the largest operator of stock exchanges in Germany – in 2001, when it had reached around €100 million in annual sales.

After staying on the executive board of Deutsche Börse Systems AG for one year in 2002, in 2003 Jung began investing in early-stage Internet and mobile companies. From 2004 to 2010, Jung invested in and consulted, among others, Xing (Germany); StudiVZ (Germany), which sold to Holtzbrinck in 2006; Adscale (Germany); Beyondtherack (Canada); DeinDeal (Switzerland); KupiVIP (Russia); Brandsclub (Brazil), which sold to Globo 2011; Markafoni (Turkey), which sold to MIH in 2011; Spreets (Australia), which sold to yahoo in 2011; Brands4Friends (Germany), which sold to eBay in 2011 and Facebook (USA).

In 2011, Jung hit a milestone with Springstar when the company partnered with Airbnb to lead their international efforts for a global rollout of the business into 72 countries. Jung led this rollout, joined Airbnb full-time and dissolved Springstar in 2012. After finishing his project with Airbnb, in 2013, Jung joined Houzz to build their international operations. In 2014 Jung also joined Hoteltonight, to build their international operations.

In September 2024, Jung led an $11.5 million seed funding round for Artisan. Jung also participated in the company's $25 million Series A funding round in 2025.
