= Jon Snoddy =

American technology expert

- Occupation: Technology expert
- Known for: Advanced Development Studio Executive SVP at Walt Disney Imagineering

Jon Snoddy is an American technology expert who is currently the Advanced Development Studio Executive SVP at Walt Disney Imagineering. He was the co-founder of Big Stage Entertainment and has served as director, CTO, CCO and CTO in various technology/media firms.

== Education ==
Snoddy holds a BA in Journalism from University of South Carolina (1979). He also holds an AS in Electronics engineering from Piedmont Institute of Technology, Greenwood, South Carolina.

== Career ==
Snoddy served as the recording engineer, technical production, at National Public Radio (NPR) from January 1982 until March 1984. While working with NPR, he served as the technical director for the program "All Things Considered". He was also the technical director for US 1984 Election coverage and technical director 1984 Winter Olympics.

Between March 1984 and March 1987, Snoddy served as the project director at Lucasfilm Ltd. From 1987 to 1995, he was the director, Senior Concept Designer at Disney. Between 1987 and 1996, he served as the Senior Show Designer Walt Disney Imagineering. From March 1987 to December 1996, he served as the director, Senior Concept Designer Walt Disney Imagineering.

In 1996, Snoddy co-founded Sega GameWorks LLC alongside Steven Spielberg and Skip Paul. From 1996 to 2001, Snoddy served as the chief creative officer at GameWorks. In 2002, Snoddy and Steven Spielberg co-founded MyTelescope.com; an internet astronomy startup. From January 2003 until February 2007, he was the CCO/CTO TimePlay Entertainment. Between October 2009 and April 2014 he was the Vice President of R&D at Walt Disney Imagineering.

In 2007, Snoddy co-founded Big Stage Entertainment alongside Jonathan I. Strietzel and Jon Kraft. He also served as the CTO of the company from January 2007 to July 2009. In May 2015, Snoddy became the Advanced Development Studio Executive SVP at Walt Disney Imagineering.
