= Ticketfly =

Ticket distribution service (2008–2018)

Ticketfly was a ticket distribution service. Ticketfly was started in 2008 in San Francisco, California, and was eventually bought out and merged into Eventbrite in 2018. Andrew Dreskin, who was the CEO of Ticketfly, previously co-founded the company Ticketweb (which is now owned by Ticketmaster). Ticketfly grossed $500 million in 2013, processing 11.2 million tickets for more than 80,000 events across Canada and the United States.

After raising $37 million from investors such as Sapphire Ventures (formerly SAP Ventures), Mohr Davidow Ventures, and High Peaks Venture Partners, Ticketfly competed against Ticketmaster with cheaper tickets and social media capabilities for promoters. In 2012, they managed ticket distribution for 360 venues across the country and tripled that number in three years to more than 1,100 venues by 2015.

On October 7, 2015, Ticketfly announced its acquisition by music streaming service Pandora in a $450 million cash and stock deal to complement the company's core streaming product. CEO Brian McAndrews explained that it would leverage Ticketfly and Pandora's "engaged" user base to "thrill music lovers and lift ticket sales for artists as the most effective marketplace for connecting music makers and fans."

On June 9, 2017, Pandora sold Ticketfly to its largest competitor, Eventbrite, for $200 million.

On May 31, 2018, Ticketfly confirmed that its services were the subject of a major security breach that compromised "some client and customer information", and that the site had been taken offline as a precaution to investigate. The site briefly contained a message by "IsHaKdZ" which claimed responsibility for the hack, and threatened to release an internal database used by the site's back-end for event organizers. In early June 2018, Ticketfly said that the breach included 26 million users, and included data about their names, addresses, and phone numbers.

In November 2018, it was announced that Ticketfly would be shut down, with music-oriented features to be merged into Eventbrite.
