= NBC =

American broadcast television network

National Broadcasting Company
- Logo used since 2022
- Type: Television network
- Country: United States
- Broadcast area: United States, reaching bordering regions via overspill of the American terrestrial network
- Affiliates: List
- Headquarters: 30 Rockefeller Plaza, New York City

Programming
- Language: English
- Picture format: 1080i HDTV; 720p or 1080p via ATSC 3.0 in some markets

Ownership
- Owner: NBCUniversal
- Parent: NBC Entertainment
- Sister channels: List: Bravo; Cozi TV; NBCSN; NBC LX Home; Telemundo; TeleXitos; Universo

History
- Founded: May 19, 1926; 100 years ago
- Launched: Radio: November 15, 1926; 100 years ago; Television: April 30, 1939; 87 years ago
- Founder: David Sarnoff
- Replaced: NBC Radio Network

Links
- Website: nbc.com

Availability

Streaming media
- Affiliated Streaming Service(s): Peacock
- DirecTV Stream: Channel 392 (NBC HD East); Channel 393 (NBC HD West)
- Service(s): DirecTV Stream, FuboTV, Hulu + Live TV, Peacock, Sling TV (owned-and-operated stations only), YouTube TV

The National Broadcasting Company (NBC) is an American commercial broadcast television network, serving as the flagship property of NBC Entertainment, a division of NBCUniversal, which is a subsidiary of Comcast. It is one of NBCUniversal's two flagship namesake properties, alongside Universal Studios. It is the first and oldest major broadcast network in the United States.

NBC's headquarters are located in New York City at Rockefeller Center's Comcast Building, the network's longtime home. The network's predecessor parent companies were integral to the center's construction. NBC also notably has offices at the NBC Tower in Chicago, Illinois, and at 10 Universal City Plaza in Los Angeles, California.

Founded in 1926 by the Radio Corporation of America through its newly created "National Broadcasting Company, Inc." division, then shortly thereafter co-owned by General Electric (GE), Westinghouse, and AT&T Corporation, NBC is the oldest of the traditional "Big Three" American television networks in the 21st century (along with ABC and CBS) and is sometimes referred to as the "Peacock Network" in reference to its stylized peacock logo, which was introduced in 1956 to promote the company's innovations in early color broadcasting.

NBC has 12 owned-and-operated stations and has affiliates in almost every TV market in the United States. Some of the stations are also available in Mexico, the Caribbean, and Canada, via pay-television providers or in border areas over the air.

== History ==
Evolution of Comcast
- 1909: Independent Moving Pictures was founded by Carl Laemmle as the predecessor to Universal
- 1912: Universal Studios Hollywood was founded after Independent Moving merged with several smaller film studios
- 1915: Universal City, California, was established as the entertainment district for the Universal Studios Lot.
- 1924: MCA Inc. was founded by Jules Stein as a talent agency to book musicians
- 1926: RCA Corporation launched the NBC Radio Network, and by 1939, NBC began broadcasting on television.
- 1934: Decca Records America was established and would later grow to become Universal Music Group
- 1946: William Goetz and Leo Spitz began managing Universal Pictures, after merging International Pictures
- 1952: Decca Records America acquired a controlling stake in Universal Pictures
- 1958: MCA acquired the Universal Studios film lot and later purchased Decca Records America, and Universal Pictures in 1962
- 1963: Comcast was founded as American Cable Systems by Ralph J. Roberts
- 1973: Decca Records America is retired as a brand and renamed to MCA Records
- 1986: General Electric acquired RCA Corp and dissolved the company while retaining ownership of NBC
- 1990: Panasonic acquired a Controlling interest in MCA, but sold it to Seagram within five years after growing costs
- 1998: MCA Records acquired Polygram N.V. from Philips and was renamed to Universal Music Group
- 2000: Seagram Entertainment was sold to Vivendi and merged with StudioCanal to become Vivendi Universal
- 2002: NBC acquired Telemundo while Comcast acquired AT&T Broadband
- 2004: Vivendi Universal was consolidated with General Electric's wholly owned NBC to form NBCUniversal, while Universal Music Group was separated
- 2013: Comcast closed its acquisition of NBCUniversal from General Electric
- 2018: Sky Group was acquired from 21st Century Fox after a bidding war
- 2020: Peacock was launched
- 2026: Majority of NBCU's cable networks were spun off into another company named Versant, while Comcast later announced it would spin-off NBCUniversal and Sky into a separate company

NBC was founded in 1926 by the Radio Corporation of America (RCA) as the first and oldest major broadcast network in the United States. NBC was then owned by General Electric (GE), Westinghouse, AT&T Corporation and United Fruit Company. In 1932, the U.S. Government forced GE to sell RCA and NBC due to antitrust violations. Originally as a radio network, it pioneered commercial television in 1939, and the channel introduced color TV in 1953. In late 1986, GE regained control of RCA through its $6.4 billion purchase of the company. Although it retained NBC, GE immediately closed or sold off most of RCA's other divisions and assets.

In 2004, French media company Vivendi Universal merged its entertainment assets (Vivendi Universal Entertainment) with GE, forming NBCUniversal. Comcast purchased a controlling interest in NBCUniversal in 2011 and acquired GE's remaining stake in 2013.

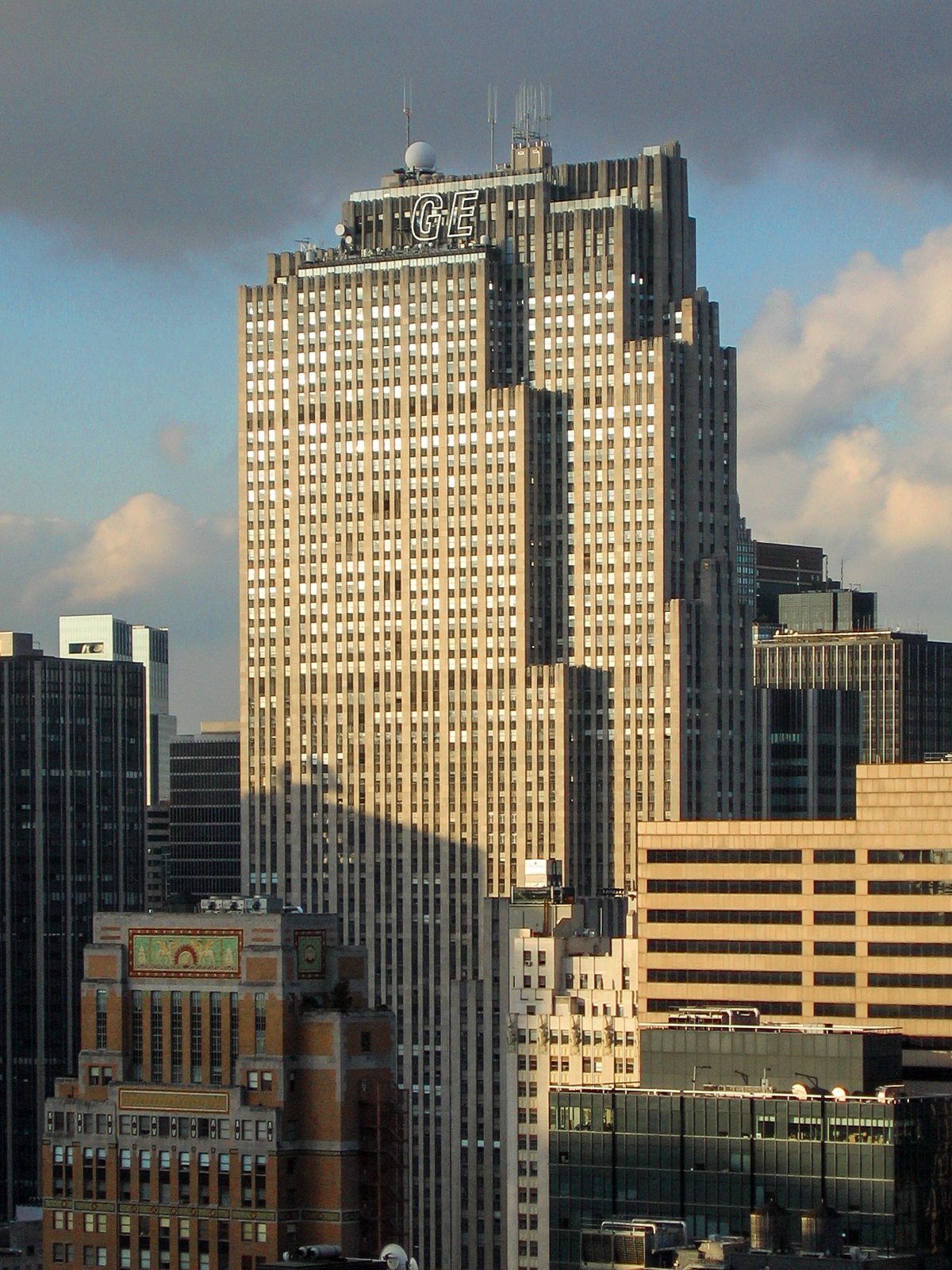
30 Rockefeller Plaza, the headquarters of NBC at Rockefeller Center in New York City

NBC is the home broadcaster of some of the longest continuously running American television series, including the news program Meet the Press (debuted 1947); Today (debuted 1952); The Tonight Show (debuted nationally 1954); and Saturday Night Live (debuted 1975). The drama series Law & Order: Special Victims Unit, which debuted in 1999, began its 26th season in October 2024 and is currently the longest-running live-action series in American prime-time television history.

== Programming ==
As of 2025, NBC provides 87 hours of regularly scheduled network programming each week. The network provides 22 hours of prime-time programming to affiliated stations Monday through Saturdays from 8:00 p.m. to 11:00 p.m. Eastern and Pacific Time (7:00 p.m.–10:00 p.m. in all other U.S. time zones) and Sundays from 7:00 p.m. to 11:00 p.m. Eastern and Pacific Time (6:00 p.m.–10:00 p.m. in all other time zones).

Daytime NBC News programming includes the morning news/interview program Today from 7:00 a.m. to 11:00 a.m. weekdays, 7:00 a.m.–8:30 a.m. / 8:00 a.m. - 9:30 a.m. on Saturdays and 7:00 a.m.–8:00 a.m. / 8:00 a.m. -9:00 a.m. on Sundays, it also airs NBC News Daily at 12:00 p.m.–1:00 p.m. on weekdays, it includes nightly editions of NBC Nightly News, the Sunday political talk show Meet the Press, weekday early-morning news program Early Today and primetime newsmagazine Dateline NBC on Friday nights. Late nights feature the weeknight talk shows The Tonight Show Starring Jimmy Fallon, Late Night with Seth Meyers, and overnight replays of Nightly News and NBC News Now's primetime newscast Top Story with Tom Llamas. NBC affiliates carrying it in syndication also have the option to substitute a same-day encore of The Kelly Clarkson Show on weekdays. On Saturdays, the LXTV-produced 1st Look and Open House NYC air after Saturday Night Live (replays of the previous week's 1st Look also air on Friday late nights on most stations), with a Meet the Press encore a part of its Sunday overnight schedule.

The network's weekend morning children's programming time slot is programmed by Litton Entertainment under a time-lease agreement. The three-hour block of programming designed mainly for 14-16-year-old teenage viewers is under the umbrella branding of The More You Know, based on the network's long-time strand of internally-produced public service announcements of the same name. It premiered on October 8, 2016, giving Litton control of all but Fox's Weekend morning E/I programming among the five major broadcast networks.

Live sports programming is also provided on weekends at any time between 7:00 a.m. and 1:30 a.m. Eastern Time, but most commonly between 12 p.m. and 6 p.m. Eastern (and from 7 and 11 p.m. on some Saturdays and all Sundays since Fall 2025 as part of its Sunday Year round sports programming block). Due to the unpredictable length of sporting events, NBC will occasionally pre-empt scheduled programs (more common with the weekend editions of NBC Nightly News, and local and syndicated programs carried by its owned-and-operated stations and affiliates). NBC has also held the American broadcasting rights to the Summer Olympic Games since the 1988 games and the rights to the Winter Olympic Games since the 2002 games. Coverage of the Olympics on NBC has included pre-empting regularly scheduled programs during daytime, prime time, and late night. In July 2022, NBC announced that the Olympic Channel will be shut down on September 30. NBC stated they will be announcing the plans for Olympic content in the fall of 2022.

=== NBC News ===
News coverage has long been an important part of NBC's operations and public image, dating to the network's radio days. Notable NBC News productions past and present include Today, NBC Nightly News (and its immediate predecessor, The Huntley–Brinkley Report), Meet the Press (which has the distinction of the longest continuously running program in the history of American television), Dateline NBC, Early Today, NBC News at Sunrise, NBC Nightside and Rock Center with Brian Williams.

In 1989, the news division began its expansion to cable with the launch of the business news channel CNBC. The company eventually formed other cable news services including MSNBC (created in 1996 originally as a joint venture with Microsoft, which now features a mix of general news and political discussion programs with a liberal stance), and the 2008 acquisition of The Weather Channel in conjunction with Blackstone Group and Bain Capital. In addition, NBCSN (operated as part of the NBC Sports Group, which became an NBC property through Comcast's acquisition of NBCUniversal) carries sports news content alongside sports event telecasts. Key anchors from NBC News are also used during NBC Sports coverage of the Olympic Games.

=== Former Daytime programming block ===
While NBC has aired a variety of soap operas on its daytime schedule over its history, Days of Our Lives (1965–2022) was the last soap opera on the network when it was taken off the air in 2022 (and moved to the Peacock streaming service). Currently the network only offers NBC News Daily on its afternoon schedule, with affiliates using the rest of the afternoon for syndicated or local programming.

Long-running daytime dramas seen on NBC in the past include The Doctors (1963–1982), Another World (1964–1999), Santa Barbara (1984–1993), and Passions (1999–2007). NBC also aired the final 4 1/2 years of Search for Tomorrow (1982–1986) after that series was initially cancelled by CBS, although many NBC affiliates did not clear the show during its tenure on the network. NBC has also aired numerous short-lived soap operas, including Generations (1989–1991), Sunset Beach (1997–1999), and the two Another World spin-offs, Somerset (1970–1976) and Texas (1980–1982).

Notable daytime game shows that once aired on NBC include The Price Is Right (1956–1963), Concentration (1958–1973; and 1987–1991 as Classic Concentration), The Match Game (1962–1969), Let's Make a Deal (1963–1968 and 1990–1991, as well as a short-lived prime-time revival in 2003), Jeopardy! (1964–1975 and 1978–1979), The Hollywood Squares (1966–1980), Wheel of Fortune (1975–1989 and 1991), Password Plus/Super Password (1979–1982 and 1984–1989), Sale of the Century (1969–1973 and 1983–1989) and Scrabble (1984–1990 and 1993). The last game show ever to air as part of NBC's daytime schedule was the short-lived Caesars Challenge, which ended in January 1994.

Notable past daytime talk shows that have aired on NBC have included Home (1954–1957), The Ernie Kovacs Show (1955–1956), The Merv Griffin Show (1962–1963), Leeza (1994–1999) and Later Today (1999–2000).

=== Children's programming ===
Children's programming has played a part in NBC's programming since its initial roots in television. NBC's first major children's series, Howdy Doody, debuted in 1947 and was one of the era's first breakthrough television shows. From the mid-1960s until 1992, the bulk of NBC's children's programming was composed of mainly animated programming including classic Looney Tunes and Woody Woodpecker shorts; reruns of prime time animated sitcoms such as The Flintstones and The Jetsons; foreign acquisitions like Astro Boy and Kimba the White Lion; animated adaptions of Punky Brewster, ALF and Star Trek as well as animated vehicles for Gary Coleman and Mr. T; live-action programs like The Banana Splits, The Bugaloos and H.R. Pufnstuf; and the original broadcasts of Gumby, The Rocky and Bullwinkle Show, Underdog, The Smurfs, Alvin and the Chipmunks and Disney's Adventures of the Gummi Bears. From 1984 to 1989, the network aired a series of public service announcements called One to Grow On, which aired after the end credits of every program or every other children's program.

In 1989, NBC premiered Saved by the Bell, a live-action teen sitcom which originated on The Disney Channel the previous year as Good Morning, Miss Bliss (which served as a starring vehicle for Hayley Mills; four cast members from that show were cast in the NBC series as the characters they originally played on Miss Bliss). Saved by the Bell, despite being given bad reviews from television critics, would become one of the most popular teen series in television history as well as the top-rated series on Saturday mornings, dethroning ABC's The Bugs Bunny and Tweety Show in its first season.

The success of Saved by the Bell led NBC to remove animated series from its Saturday morning lineup in August 1992 in favor of additional live-action series as part of a new block called TNBC, along with the debut of a Saturday edition of Today. Most of the series featured on the TNBC lineup were executive produced by Peter Engel (such as City Guys, Hang Time, California Dreams, One World and the Saved by the Bell sequel, Saved by the Bell: The New Class), with the lineup being designed from the start to meet the earliest form of the FCC's educational programming guidelines under the Children's Television Act. NBA Inside Stuff, an analysis and interview program aimed at teens that was hosted for most of its run by Ahmad Rashad, was also a part of the TNBC lineup during the NBA season until 2002 (when the program moved to ABC as a result of that network taking the NBA rights from NBC).

In 2002, NBC entered into an agreement with Discovery Communications to carry educational children's programs from the Discovery Kids cable channel. Debuting that September, the Discovery Kids on NBC block originally consisted exclusively of live-action series, including reality series Trading Spaces: Boys vs. Girls (a kid-themed version of the TLC series Trading Spaces); the Emmy-nominated reality game show Endurance, hosted and produced by J. D. Roth (whose production company, 3-Ball Productions, would also produce reality series The Biggest Loser for NBC beginning in 2003); and scripted series such as Strange Days at Blake Holsey High and Scout's Safari. The block later expanded to include some animated series such as Kenny the Shark, Tutenstein and Time Warp Trio.

In May 2006, NBC announced plans to launch a new Saturday morning children's block under the Qubo brand in September 2006. An endeavor originally operated as a joint venture between NBCUniversal, Ion Media Networks, Scholastic Press, Classic Media and Corus Entertainment's Nelvana unit (Ion acquired the other partners' shares in 2013), the Qubo venture also encompassed weekly blocks on Telemundo and Ion Television, a 24-hour digital multicast network on Ion's owned-and-operated and affiliated stations, as well as video on demand services and a branded website. Qubo launched on NBC on September 9, 2006, with six programs (VeggieTales, Dragon, VeggieTales Presents: 3-2-1 Penguins!, Babar, Jane and the Dragon and Jacob Two-Two).

On March 28, 2012, it was announced that NBC would launch a new Saturday morning preschool block programmed by Sprout (originally jointly owned by NBCUniversal, PBS, Sesame Workshop and Apax Partners, with the former acquiring the other's interests later that year). The block, NBC Kids, premiered on July 7, 2012, replacing the "Qubo on NBC" block.

On February 24, 2016, it was announced that NBC would launch a new Saturday morning block programmed by Litton Entertainment under the Children's Television Act. It's called The More You Know, inspired by the name of brand extension of The More You Know—a series of public service campaigns first launched by NBC in 1989. The block premiered on October 8, 2016, replacing NBC Kids block (originally October 1, 2016, but postponed due to the NBC network coverage of the 2016 Ryder Cup).

=== Specials ===
NBC holds the broadcast rights to several annual specials and award show telecasts, including the Golden Globe Awards and the Primetime Emmy Awards (which are rotated across all four major networks each year). Since 1953, NBC has served as the official American broadcaster of the Macy's Thanksgiving Day Parade. CBS also carries unauthorized coverage of the Macy's parade as part of The Thanksgiving Day Parade on CBS; however, as NBC holds rights to the parade, it has exclusivity over the broadcast of Broadway and music performances appearing in the parade (CBS airs live performances separate from those seen in the parade as a result), and Macy's chose to reroute the parade in 2012 out of the view of CBS' cameras, although it continues to cover the parade. NBC began airing a same-day rebroadcast of the parade telecast in 2009 (replacing its annual Thanksgiving afternoon airing of Miracle on 34th Street). In 2007, NBC acquired the rights to the National Dog Show, which airs following the Macy's Thanksgiving Day Parade each year.

From 2003 to 2014, NBC also held rights to two of the three pageants organized by the Miss Universe Organization: the Miss Universe and Miss USA pageants (NBC also held rights to the Miss Teen USA pageant from 2003, when NBC also assumed rights to the Miss USA and Miss Universe pageants as part of a deal brokered by Miss Universe Organization owner Donald Trump that gave the network half-ownership of the pageants, until 2007, when NBC declined to renew its contract to carry Miss Teen USA, effectively discontinuing televised broadcasts of that event until 2023). NBCUniversal relinquished the rights to Miss Universe and Miss USA on June 29, 2015, as part of its decision to cut business ties with Donald Trump and the Miss Universe Organization (which was half-owned by corporate parent NBCUniversal) in response to controversial remarks about Mexican immigrants made by Trump during the launch of his 2016 campaign for the Republican presidential nomination.

== Stations ==
NBC has twelve owned-and-operated stations and current and pending affiliation agreements with 222 additional television stations encompassing 50 states, the District of Columbia, six U.S. possessions and two non-U.S. territories (Aruba and Bermuda). The network has a national reach of 88.91% of all households in the United States (or 277,821,345 Americans with at least one television set). From January 24, 2022, when CBS affiliate WBKB-TV in Alpena, Michigan, affiliated its second digital subchannel with NBC, to December 31, 2024, when KXGN-TV in Glendive, Montana, dropped NBC from its second digital subchannel, NBC was the only major network with an in-market affiliate in every designated market area in the United States.

Currently, New Jersey and Delaware are the only U.S. states where NBC does not have a locally licensed affiliate. New Jersey is served by New York City O&O WNBC-TV and Philadelphia O&O WCAU; New Jersey formerly had an in-state affiliate in Atlantic City-based WMGM-TV, which was affiliated with the network from 1966 to 2014. Delaware is served by Salisbury affiliate WRDE-LD and Philadelphia-based WCAU. NBC maintains affiliations with low-power stations in a few smaller markets, such as Binghamton, New York (WBGH-CD), Jackson, Tennessee (WNBJ-LD) and Juneau, Alaska (KATH-LD), that do not have enough full-power stations to support a standalone affiliate. In some markets, these stations also maintain digital simulcasts on a subchannel of a co-owned/co-managed full-power television station.

Southern New Hampshire receives NBC programming via network-owned WBTS-CD, licensed to serve Nashua; while nominally licensed as a low-power class A station, it transmits a full-power signal under a channel share with the WGBH Educational Foundation and its secondary Boston station WGBX-TV from Needham, Massachusetts, and serves as the NBC station for the entire Boston market. Until 2019, NBC operated a low-powered station in Boston, WBTS-LD (now WYCN-LD), which aimed to serve as its station in that market while using a network of additional full-power stations to cover the market in full (including Merrimack, New Hampshire-licensed Telemundo station WNEU, which transmitted WBTS on a second subchannel); NBC purchased the Nashua station (formerly WYCN-CD) in early 2018 after the FCC spectrum auction, and in 2019 relocated WYCN-LD to Providence, Rhode Island, to serve as a Telemundo station for that market.

Tegna Inc., a subsidiary of Nexstar Media Group, is the largest operator of NBC stations in terms of overall market reach, owning or providing services to 20 NBC affiliates (including those in larger markets such as Atlanta, Denver, St. Louis, Seattle and Cleveland); Gray Television is the largest owner and operator of NBC stations by quantity and numerical total, owning 64 NBC-affiliated stations.

== Related services ==
=== Video-on-demand services ===
NBC provides video on demand access for delayed viewing of the network's programming through various means, including via its website at NBC.com, a traditional VOD service called NBC on Demand available on most traditional cable and IPTV providers, and through content deals with Hulu and Netflix (the latter of which carries only cataloged episodes of NBC programs, after losing the right to carry newer episodes of its programs during their current seasons in July 2011). From 2007 to 2025, NBCUniversal was a part-owner of Hulu (along with majority owner The Walt Disney Company, owner of ABC), and has offered full-length episodes of most of NBC's programming through the streaming service (which are available for viewing on Hulu's website and mobile app) since Hulu launched in private beta testing on October 29, 2007.

The most recent episodes of the network's shows are usually made available on NBC.com and Hulu the day after their original broadcast. In addition, NBC.com and certain other partner websites (including Hulu) provide complete back catalogs of most of its current series as well as a limited selection of episodes of classic series from the NBCUniversal Television Distribution program library – including shows not broadcast by NBC during their original runs (including the complete or partial episode catalogs of shows like 30 Rock, The A-Team, Charles in Charge, Emergency!, Knight Rider (both the original series and the short-lived 2008 reboot), Kojak, Miami Vice, The Office, Quantum Leap and Simon & Simon).

On February 18, 2015, NBC began providing live programming streams of local NBC stations in select markets, which are only available to authenticated subscribers of participating pay television providers. All eleven NBC-owned-and-operated stations owned by NBCUniversal Owned Television Stations' were the first stations to offer streams of their programming on NBC's website and mobile app, and new affiliation agreements have made a majority of the network's affiliates available through the network's website and app based on a viewer's location. The network's NFL game telecasts were not permitted to be streamed on the service for several years until a change to the league's mobile rights agreement in the 2018 season allowed games to be streamed through network websites and apps.

=== NBC HD ===
NBC's master feed is transmitted in 1080i high definition, the native resolution format for NBCUniversal's television properties. However, 19 of its affiliates transmit the network's programming in 720p HD, while four others carry the network feed in 480i standard definition either due to technical considerations for affiliates of other major networks that carry NBC programming on a digital subchannel or because a primary feed NBC affiliate has not yet upgraded their transmission equipment to allow content to be presented in HD.

NBC's master feed has not fully converted to 1080p or 2160p ultra-high-definition television (UHD). However, some NBC stations have already begun broadcasting at 1080p via ATSC 3.0 multiplex stations. One notable example is WRAL-TV in Raleigh, North Carolina (a station that re-joined NBC in February 2016), which is currently also broadcasting at 1080p via WNGT-CD, which is also serving as an ATSC 3.0 multiplex for the Raleigh area. While the equipment would allow the transmission of 2160p UHD, this was previously done through a secondary experimental station (WRAL-EX) where it transmitted limited NBC programming in UHD. The experimental station went off-air in 2018 as part of the FCC's repacking process.

Meet the Press was the first regular series on a major television network to produce a high-definition broadcast on February 2, 1997, which aired in the format over WHD-TV in Washington, D.C., an experimental television station owned by a consortium of industry groups and stations which launched to allow testing of HD broadcasts and operated until 2002 (the program itself continued to be transmitted in 480i standard definition over the NBC network until May 2, 2010, when it became the last NBC News program to convert to HD). NBC officially began its conversion to high definition with the launch of its simulcast feed, NBC HD, on April 26, 1999, when The Tonight Show became the first HD program to air on the NBC network as well as the first regularly scheduled American network program to be produced and transmitted in high definition. NBC gradually converted much of its existing programming from standard-definition to high definition beginning with the 2002–03 season, with select shows among that season's slate of freshmen scripted series being broadcast in HD from their debuts.

NBC completed its conversion to high definition in September 2012, with the launch of NBC Kids, a new Saturday morning children's block programmed by new partial sister network PBS Kids Sprout, which also became the second Saturday morning children's block with an entirely HD schedule (after the ABC-syndicated Litton's Weekend Adventure). All the network's programming has been presented in full HD since then (except for certain holiday specials produced prior to 2005 – such as its annual broadcast of It's a Wonderful Life – which continues to be presented in 4:3 SD, although some have been remastered for HD broadcast).

The network's high-definition programming is broadcast in 5.1 surround sound.

=== NBCi ===
NBCi header used from 1999 to 2007

In 1999, NBC launched NBCi (briefly changing its web address to "www.nbci.com"), a heavily advertised online venture serving as an attempt to launch a web portal. This move saw NBC partner with Xoom.com (not to be confused with the current money transfer service), e-mail.com, AllBusiness.com, and Snap.com (eventually acquiring all four companies outright; not to be confused with the current-day parent of Snapchat) to launch a multi-faceted internet portal with e-mail, web hosting, community, chat, personalization capabilities, and news content. Subsequently, in April 2000, NBC purchased GlobalBrain, a company specializing in search engines that learned from searches initiated by its users, for $32 million.

The experiment lasted roughly one season; after its failure, NBCi's operations were folded back into NBC. The NBC Television portion of the website reverted to NBC.com. However, the NBCi website continued in operation as a portal for NBC-branded content (NBCi.com would be redirected to NBCi.msnbc.com), using a co-branded version of InfoSpace to deliver minimal portal content. In mid-2007, NBCi.com began to mirror the main NBC.com website; NBCi.com was eventually redirected to the NBC.com domain in 2010. Only one legacy of this direction remains in the website of then-O&O WCMH-TV in Columbus, Ohio (now owned by Nexstar), which continues to use the URL "nbc4i.com".

== Logo history ==
NBC has used a number of logos throughout its history; early logos used by the television and radio networks were similar to the logo of its then-parent company, RCA. Logos used later in NBC's existence incorporated stylized peacock designs, including the current version that has been in use since 1986.

== International broadcasts ==
=== Canada ===
NBC network programs can be received throughout most of Canada on cable, satellite and IPTV providers through certain U.S.-based affiliates of the network (such as WBTS-CD in Boston, KING-TV in Seattle, KBJR-TV in Duluth, Minnesota, WGRZ in Buffalo, New York and WHEC-TV in Rochester, New York). Some programs carried on these stations are subject to simultaneous substitutions, a practice imposed by the Canadian Radio-television and Telecommunications Commission in which a pay television provider supplants an American station's signal with a feed from a Canadian station/network airing a particular program in the same time slot to protect domestic advertising revenue. Some of these affiliates are also receivable over the air in southern areas of the country located near the Canada–United States border (signal coverage was somewhat reduced after the digital television transition in 2009 due to the lower radiated power required to transmit digital signals).

=== Europe and the Middle East ===
NBC no longer exists outside the Americas as a channel in its own right. However, NBC News and MSNBC programs are broadcast for a few hours a day on OSN News, formerly known as Orbit News in Africa and the Middle East. Sister network CNBC Europe also broadcasts occasional breaking news coverage from MSNBC as well as The Tonight Show Starring Jimmy Fallon. CNBC Europe also broadcast daily airings of NBC Nightly News at 00:30 CET Monday to Fridays.

==== NBC Super Channel becomes NBC Europe ====
In 1993, then-NBC parent General Electric acquired Super Channel, relaunching the Pan-European cable network as NBC Super Channel. In 1996, the channel was renamed NBC Europe, but was, from then on, almost always referred to on-air as simply "NBC".

Most of NBC Europe's prime time programming was produced in Europe due to rights restrictions associated with U.S. prime time shows; the channel's weekday late-night schedule after 11:00 p.m. Central European Time, however, featured The Tonight Show, Late Night with Conan O'Brien and Later, which the channel's slogan "Where the Stars Come Out at Night" was based around. Many NBC News programs were broadcast on NBC Europe, including Dateline NBC, Meet the Press and NBC Nightly News, the latter of which was broadcast simultaneously with the initial U.S. telecast. Today was also initially aired live in the afternoons, but was later broadcast instead the following morning on a more than half-day delay.

In 1999, NBC Europe ceased broadcasting in most of Europe outside of Germany; the network was concurrently relaunched as a German-language technology channel aimed at a younger demographic, with the new series NBC GIGA as its flagship program. In 2005, the channel was relaunched again as the free-to-air movie channel Das Vierte which eventually shut down end of 2013 (acquired by Disney, which replaced it with a German version of Disney Channel). GIGA Television was subsequently spun off as a separate digital channel, available on satellite and cable providers in Germany, Austria and Switzerland, which shut down as a TV station in the end of 2009.

=== Latin America ===
==== Mexico ====
NBC programming is available in Mexico through free-to-air affiliates in markets located within proximity to the Mexico–United States border (such as KYMA-DT in Yuma, Arizona; KGNS-TV in Laredo, Texas; KTSM-TV in El Paso, Texas; KVEO-TV in Brownsville, Texas; and KNSD in San Diego), whose signals are readily receivable over-the-air in border areas of northern Mexico. Some U.S.-based border affiliates are also available on subscription television providers throughout the country, including in the Mexico City area.

==== Central America ====
During the 1990s to early 2010s, many subscription television providers carried either some U.S.-based NBC and Telemundo affiliated stations or the main network feed from NBCUniversal or Telemundo.

In late 2017, NBC affiliates stopped being distributed in the region. This decision coincided with other U.S. affiliated stations from ABC and CBS also being pulled off from the air in the region. This was due to concerns expressed by the broadcasters on broadcasting rights outside their original local coverage area.

==== Canal de Noticias ====
In 1993, NBC launched a 24-hour Spanish-language news channel serving Latin America (the second news channel serving that region overall, after Noticias ECO, and the first to broadcast 24 hours a day), Canal de Noticias NBC, which based its news schedule around the "wheel" format conceived at CNN. The channel, which was headquartered in the offices of the NBC News Channel affiliate news service in Charlotte, North Carolina, employed over 50 journalists to produce, write, anchor and provide technical services. Canal de Noticias NBC shut down in 1999 due to the channel's inability to generate sustainable advertising revenue.

=== Caribbean ===
In the Caribbean, many subscription providers carry either select U.S.-based NBC-affiliated stations or the main network feed from NBC and Telemundo O&Os WNBC and WNJU in New York City or WTVJ and WSCV in Miami. In addition, the network's programming has been available in the U.S. Virgin Islands since 2004 on WVGN-LD in Charlotte Amalie (owned by LKK Group), while Telemundo owned-and-operated station WKAQ-TV in San Juan, Puerto Rico carries the WNBC feed on a digital subchannel.

==== Bahamas ====
In the Bahamas, NBC programming is available via U.S.-based affiliate stations on domestic cable providers.

==== Netherlands Antilles ====
Until its bankruptcy and cessation of operations in 2016, NBC maintained an affiliation in Aruba with Oranjestad station PJA-TV (which branded on-air as "15 ATV"). Aruba currently receives NBC service from network flagship WNBC via cable.

=== Puerto Rico ===
In Puerto Rico, Telemundo O&O WKAQ-TV carries "NBC Puerto Rico" over their third subchannel, which is effectively a simulcast of WNBC with some local advertising and station identification.

=== Bermuda ===
Until it ended operations in 2014, NBC's entire program lineup was carried by VSB-TV, using the Eastern Time Zone feed, though an hour ahead due to its location in the Atlantic Time Zone. Bermuda currently receives NBC service from WTVJ Miami via cable.

=== Pacific ===
==== Guam ====
In Guam, the entire NBC programming lineup is carried by Hagåtña affiliate KUAM-TV (which has been an NBC affiliate since 1956) via the network's East Coast satellite feed. Entertainment and news programming is broadcast day and date on a one-day tape delay as Guam is on the west side of the International Date Line (for example, the network's Thursday prime time lineup airs Friday evenings on KUAM, and is advertised by the station as airing on the latter night in on-air promotions). Live programming, including breaking news and sporting events, airs as scheduled; because of the time difference with the six U.S. time zones, live sports coverage often airs on the station early in the morning. From 1969 until 1980, KUAM's programming was relayed to the Northern Mariana Islands via satellite station WSZE in Saipan.

==== American Samoa ====
In American Samoa, NBC was affiliated with KKHJ-LP in Pago Pago from 2005 to 2012. Cable television providers on the islands carry the network's programming via Seattle affiliate KING-TV.

==== Federated States of Micronesia ====
In the Federated States of Micronesia, NBC programming is available on domestic cable providers via Honolulu affiliate KHNL.

=== Asia ===
==== NBC Asia and CNBC Asia ====
NBC Asia launched in 1994, distributed to India, Japan, Malaysia, South Korea, Taiwan, Thailand, Pakistan and the Philippines. Like NBC Europe, NBC Asia featured most of NBC's news programs as well as The Tonight Show, Late Night and Saturday Night Live. Like its European counterpart, it was not allowed to broadcast American-produced prime time shows due to existing broadcast agreements with other domestic broadcasters. NBC Asia produced a regional evening news program that aired each weeknight, and occasionally simulcast some programs from CNBC Asia and MSNBC. NBC also operated NBC Super Sports, a 24-hour channel devoted to televising sporting events.

In July 1998, NBC Asia was replaced by a regional version of the National Geographic Channel.

==== Regional partners ====
Through regional partners, NBC-produced programs are seen in some countries on the continent. In the Philippines, Jack TV (owned by Solar Entertainment) airs Will & Grace and Saturday Night Live, while TalkTV airs The Tonight Show and NBC News programs including the weekday and weekend editions of Today, Early Today, Dateline NBC and NBC Nightly News. Solar TV formerly broadcast The Jay Leno Show from 2009 to 2010. In Hong Kong, the English language free-to-air channel TVB Pearl (operated by TVB) airs live broadcasts of NBC Nightly News, as well as other select NBC programs.

=== Australia ===
In Australia, the Seven Network has maintained close ties with NBC and has used a majority of the U.S. network's image campaigns and slogans since the 1970s (conversely, in 2009, NBC and Seven both used the Guy Sebastian single "Like it Like That" in image promos for their respective summer schedules). The network's Seven News division has used John Williams-composed "The Mission" (the proprietary theme music for NBC News' flagship programs since 1985) as the theme music for its local and national news programs since the mid-1980s, though re-composed domestically to meet their own branding image. Local newscasts were also titled Seven Nightly News from the mid-1980s until c. 2000. NBC News and Seven News often share news resources, with the former division using Seven's reporters for breaking news coverage and select taped story packages relating to Australian stories and the latter sometimes incorporating NBC News reports into its national bulletins.

Seven also rebroadcasts some of NBC's news and current affairs programming during the early morning hours (usually from 3:00 to 5:00 a.m. local time), including the weekday and weekend editions of Today (which it brands as NBC Today to differentiate it from the unrelated morning program of the same title on the Nine Network), Dateline NBC and Meet the Press.

== Criticism and controversies ==
During the Gulf War NBC received criticism of its reporting of the conflict.

In March and April 2019, the Huffington Post and Wired reported that NBC had paid a firm to improve its reputation by lobbying for changes to the Wikipedia articles on NBC, Nextdoor and several others.

The NBC television network has been accused of tolerating a culture of sexism and sexual harassment among its employees (especially within upper management and among senior anchors such as Matt Lauer) and also of covering up indiscretions committed by prominent figures in the company through intimidation campaigns against victims that include widespread use of non-disclosure agreements. This may have exposed the company to pressure from Harvey Weinstein to delay or terminate reporting on Weinstein's criminal abuse of many women.

== Presidents of NBC Entertainment ==
Executive	Term	Position
Sylvester Weaver	1953–1955	Weaver was hired by NBC in 1949, to help challenge CBS's rating lead. While at NBC, Weaver established many operating practices that became standard for network television; he introduced the practice of networks producing their own television programs and selling advertising time during the broadcasts. Prior to this, advertising agencies usually developed each show for a particular client. Because commercial slots could now more easily be sold to more than one corporate sponsor for each program, a single advertiser pulling out of a program would not necessarily threaten it. Weaver also created several series for the network, Today (in 1952), Tonight Starring Steve Allen (in 1954, the first program in the Tonight Show franchise), Home (1954) and Wide Wide World (1955). Weaver strongly believed that broadcasting should educate as well as entertain, and required NBC shows to typically include at least one sophisticated cultural reference or performance per installment – including a segment of a Giuseppe Verdi opera adapted in the comedic style of Sid Caesar and Imogene Coca's groundbreaking Your Show of Shows. Weaver did not ignore NBC Radio and gave it a shot in the arm in 1955, at a time when network radio was dying and giving way to television, when he developed NBC Monitor, a weekend-long magazine-style block featuring an array of news, music, comedy, drama and sports, with rotating advertisers and some of the most memorable names in broadcast journalism, entertainment and sports that ran until 1975 (20 years after Weaver's departure). Weaver departed shortly afterward, following disputes with NBC chairman David Sarnoff, who believed that his ideas were either too expensive or too highbrow for company tastes. His respective successors, Robert Sarnoff and Robert Kintner standardized the network's programming practices with far less of the ambitiousness that characterized the Weaver years.
Robert E. Kintner	1958–1966	Kintner was appointed president in 1958; his tenure at NBC was marked by his aggressive effort to push the network's news division past CBS News in ratings and prestige. The news division was given more money, leading it to gain additional resources to provide coverage, notably of the 1960 Presidential election campaign, and led the Huntley-Brinkley Report to prominence among the network news programs.
Julian Goodman	1966–1974	Goodman, who joined NBC in 1966, helped establish Chet Huntley and David Brinkley as a well-known anchor team. While working at NBC, he negotiated a $1 million deal to retain Johnny Carson as host of The Tonight Show.
Herbert Schlosser	1974–1978	After Johnny Carson announced he wanted to cancel the weekend editions of The Tonight Show in order to instead have repeats of it aired on weeknights, Schlosser approached his vice president of late-night programming, Dick Ebersol, and asked him to create a show to fill the Saturday nighttime slot. At the suggestion of Paramount Pictures executive Barry Diller, Schlosser and Ebersol then approached Lorne Michaels. Over the next three weeks, Ebersol and Michaels developed the latter's idea for a variety show featuring high-concept comedy sketches, political satire, and music performances. By 1975 Michaels had assembled a talented cast, including Dan Aykroyd, John Belushi, Chevy Chase, Jane Curtin, Garrett Morris, Laraine Newman, Michael O'Donoghue, Gilda Radner, and George Coe. The show was originally called NBC's Saturday Night because Saturday Night Live was in use by a program on the rival network ABC that was hosted by its sportscaster Howard Cosell. NBC purchased the rights to the name in 1976 and officially adopted the new title on March 26, 1977. Saturday Night Live remains on the air to this day.
Fred Silverman	1978–1981	Although Silverman developed many successful shows during his tenure at ABC, he left that network to become president and CEO of NBC in 1978. His three-year tenure at the network proved to be a difficult period for the network, marked by several high-profile failures such as Hello, Larry, Pink Lady and Jeff, Supertrain and the Jean Doumanian era of Saturday Night Live (Silverman hired Doumanian after Al Franken, the planned successor for outgoing creator/executive producer Lorne Michaels, castigated Silverman's failures in a sketch on the program). Despite these failures, high points during Silverman's tenure included the launch of Hill Street Blues and the miniseries Shōgun. He also brought David Letterman to the network to host daytime talker The David Letterman Show, two years before the debut of Letterman's successful late night program in 1982, after Silverman negotiated a holding deal after the former's cancellation to keep Letterman from going to another network. However, Silverman nearly lost late-night leader Johnny Carson, who filed a lawsuit against NBC during a contract dispute with the network; the case was settled out of court and Carson remained with NBC in exchange for acquiring the rights to his show and permission to reduce his time on-air (leading to the use of guest hosts on The Tonight Show such as Joan Rivers and his immediate successor, Jay Leno). Silverman also developed successful sitcoms such as Diff'rent Strokes, The Facts of Life and Gimme a Break!, and made the series commitments that led to Cheers and St. Elsewhere. Silverman also pioneered the reality television genre with the 1979 debut of Real People. His contributions to the network's game show output included the Goodson-Todman-produced Card Sharks and a revival of Password, both of which enjoyed great success as part of the morning schedule, although he also canceled several other relatively popular series, including The Hollywood Squares and High Rollers, to make way for The David Letterman Show (those cancellations also threatened Wheel of Fortune, whose host, Chuck Woolery, left in a payment dispute during Silverman's tenure, although the show survived). Silverman also oversaw, while simultaneously objecting to, the hiring of Pat Sajak as the new host of Wheel (Sajak stayed with the show, mostly as host of its syndicated incarnation, through to his 2024 retirement). On Saturday mornings, at a time when there was much similarity in animated content on the major networks, Silverman oversaw the development of an animated series based on The Smurfs (which ran from 1981 to 1989, well after Silverman's departure, making it one of his longest-lasting contributions to the network) as well as a revival of The Flintstones. In addition, Silverman revitalized the NBC News division, helping Today and NBC Nightly News achieve parity with their competition for the first time in years; and created a new FM radio division with competitive stations in New York City, Chicago, San Francisco and Washington, D.C. During his NBC tenure, Silverman also brought in an entirely new divisional and corporate management team, which remained in place long after Silverman's departure (among this group was Brandon Tartikoff, who as President of Entertainment, would help get NBC back on top by 1985). Silverman also reintroduced the peacock as NBC's corporate logo in 1979.
Brandon Tartikoff	1981–1991	Tartikoff was hired as a program executive at ABC in 1976. He joined NBC the following year, after being hired by Dick Ebersol to direct comedy programs for the network. Tartikoff took over as president of NBC's entertainment division in 1981, becoming the youngest person ever to hold the position, at age 32. At the time Tartikoff took over, NBC was mired in last place behind ABC and CBS, and faced a looming writers' strike and affiliates defecting to other networks (mostly to ABC); Little House on the Prairie, Diff'rent Strokes and Real People were the only prime time shows the network had in the Nielsen Top 20. Also of issue, Johnny Carson was reportedly in talks to move his landmark late-night talk show to ABC; while the original cast and writing staff of Saturday Night Live had left the show, and their replacements had earned SNL some of its worst reviews. By 1982, Tartikoff and network president Grant Tinker gradually turned the network's fortunes around. Tartikoff's successes as President of Entertainment included The Cosby Show (Tartikoff had pursued actor-comedian Bill Cosby to create a comedy pilot after having been impressed by the comedian's stories when Cosby was a guest host on The Tonight Show), the iconic 1980s drama Miami Vice (Tartikoff wrote a brainstorming memo that simply read "MTV cops", and later presented it to former Hill Street Blues writer/producer Anthony Yerkovich, who turned into the concept behind Miami Vice). and Knight Rider (which was inspired by a perceived lack of leading men who could act, with Tartikoff suggesting that a talking car could fill in the gaps in any leading man's acting abilities). While Family Ties was undergoing its casting process, Tartikoff was unexcited about Michael J. Fox being considered for the role of Alex P. Keaton; however, creator/executive producer Gary David Goldberg insisted on having Fox in the role until Tartikoff relented, saying, "Go ahead if you insist. But I'm telling you, this is not the kind of face you'll ever see on a lunch box". After Fox's stardom was cemented by Back to the Future, he good-naturedly sent Tartikoff a lunch box with Fox's picture that contained a note reading: "To Brandon: This is for you to put your crow in. Love and Kisses, Michael J. Fox", which Tartikoff kept in his office for the rest of his career. Johnny Carson broke the news of his retirement in February 1991 to Tartikoff during a lunch meeting at the Grille in Beverly Hills. Tartikoff and chairman Bob Wright were the only ones who knew of the planned retirement before it was made public days later. Tartikoff wrote in his memoirs that his biggest professional regret was cancelling the series Buffalo Bill, which he later went on to include in a fantasy "dream schedule" created for a TV Guide article that detailed his idea of "The Greatest Network Ever".
Warren Littlefield	1991–1998	Littlefield helped develop Cheers, The Cosby Show and The Golden Girls as senior, and later, executive vice president of NBC Entertainment under Brandon Tartikoff, of whom Littlefield was his protégé. During his tenure as president of NBC, Littlefield oversaw the creation of many hit shows during the 1990s such as Seinfeld, The Fresh Prince of Bel-Air, Wings, Blossom, Law & Order, Mad About You, Sisters, Frasier, Friends, ER, Homicide: Life on the Street, Caroline in the City, NewsRadio, 3rd Rock from the Sun, Suddenly Susan, Just Shoot Me!, Will & Grace and The West Wing.
Scott Sassa	1998–1999	Sassa joined NBC in September 1997 as president of the NBC Television Stations division, where he was responsible for overseeing the operation of NBC's then 13 owned-and-operated stations. In October 1998, Sassa became president of NBC Entertainment, lasting in that position for eight months until he was reassigned to NBC's West Coast division in May 1999, where, as its president, he oversaw NBC's entertainment-related businesses. Sassa made the transition to that position after working alongside his predecessor, Don Ohlmeyer. During this time, he oversaw the development and production of NBC's new prime time series, including such shows as The West Wing, Law & Order: Special Victims Unit and Fear Factor. Under Sassa, NBC rated as the No. 1 network for three out of four seasons.
Garth Ancier	1999–2000	Ancier, who also worked as a television producer (most notably, serving as executive producer of tabloid talk show Ricki Lake) prior to joining the network, was named President of NBC Entertainment in 1999.
Jeff Zucker	2000–2004	Zucker was named President of NBC Entertainment in 2000, succeeding Garth Ancier. In a 2004 profile on Zucker, Businessweek stated that in his four years as entertainment president, he was responsible for having "kept the network ahead of the pack by airing the gross out show Fear Factor, negotiating for the cast of the hit series Friends to take the series up to a tenth season, and signing Donald Trump for the reality show The Apprentice" and having helped increase NBC's operating revenue from $532 million in 1999 to $870 million by 2003. Other critical or commercial successes green lit under Zucker included Las Vegas, Law & Order: Criminal Intent and Scrubs. He originated the concept of airing "Supersized" episodes (running longer than the standard 30-minute slot) of NBC sitcoms during sweeps and making aggressive programming efforts during the summer to compete with cable networks that began to draw viewers to their original programming content while the networks ran mostly reruns. Zucker also oversaw the successful transition of Bravo (which NBC acquired from Rainbow Media in 2002) from a film and arts-focused network to a network primarily reliant on reality series, and the repositioning of Telemundo to become more competitive with leading Spanish-language network Univision. In May 2004, following NBC's merger with Vivendi Universal, Zucker was promoted to president of the NBC Universal Television Group. Zucker's responsibilities, which already included NBC's cable channels, were expanded to include oversight of television production as well as USA Network, Sci-Fi Channel and Trio. Following his promotion, NBC slid from first place to fourth in the ratings. Shows that Zucker championed such as animated series Father of the Pride and the Friends spinoff Joey floundered.
Kevin Reilly	2004–2007	Reilly was appointed President of Entertainment in May 2004. Having begun his career at NBC Entertainment almost two decades earlier, he returned to the network in the fall of 2003 as President of Primetime Development. Early in his NBC career, Reilly supervised Law & Order in its first season and helped develop ER. After his first stint at NBC, Reilly became President of Brad Grey Television, the television production arm of Brillstein-Grey Entertainment, in 1994. He was responsible for the development of the pilot for The Sopranos, and NBC sitcoms Just Shoot Me! and NewsRadio. Reilly's vocal support of The Office helped it survive its first season, despite it suffering from low ratings. Shows developed under Reilly included My Name Is Earl, Heroes, 30 Rock and Friday Night Lights. Although he signed a new three-year contract with NBC in February 2007, Reilly was terminated as president in late May 2007. Approximately one month later, he joined Fox as its President of Entertainment.
Ben Silverman	2007–2009	Silverman and Marc Graboff were appointed co-chairmen of NBC Entertainment in 2007, succeeding Kevin Reilly. That year, Silverman became the first producer since Norman Lear (in 1973) to have two Emmy-nominated shows in the "Outstanding Comedy/Variety Series" category (The Office and ABC's Ugly Betty). He is credited for his role in saving the critically acclaimed but low-rated NBC drama Friday Night Lights by striking an innovative deal, in which DirecTV agreed to take on a substantial amount of the show's production budget in exchange for exclusive first window rights to broadcast the program on The 101 while NBC would re-air the episodes later in the season.
Jeff Gaspin	2009–2010	Gaspin first joined NBC in the early 1980s, as part of its associates program, after failing to find any jobs in finance on Wall Street. After spending five years in the finance department, he was promoted to a programming position at NBC News at the urging of the news division's then-president Michael Gartner, before being moved to the entertainment division. During his first tenure, Gaspin helped to develop and launch Dateline NBC and oversaw the expansion of Today to weekends. In 1996, Gaspin left NBC to become program development chief at VH1. Gaspin returned to NBC in 2001 as Executive Vice President of Program Strategy at NBC Entertainment, where he helped to develop new programs such as The Apprentice and The Biggest Loser. In 2002, Gaspin was appointed as President of Bravo, following NBC's purchase of the cable channel, where his most notable accomplishments were the massive hits Queer Eye for the Straight Guy and Project Runway. He was reassigned to President of NBC Universal Cable and Digital Content in 2007. In July 2009, Gaspin was promoted to Chairman of NBC Universal Television Entertainment, becoming responsible for NBC Entertainment, USA Network, Bravo and NBC Universal Domestic Television Distribution.
Robert Greenblatt	2011–2018	Greenblatt succeeded Jeff Gaspin in January 2011 after Comcast took control of NBCUniversal. Under Greenblatt's direction, NBC saw major successes with the Chicago series franchise, This Is Us, the revival of Will & Grace, and several live musical productions. The success of many of his programs led NBC to take over CBS as the No. 1 network during the 2017–18 television season for the first time in sixteen years. Greenblatt departed NBC in September 2018.
George Cheeks & Paul Telegdy	2018–2020	Cheeks and Telegdy succeeded Robert Greenblatt in September 2018, following Greenblatt's departure. Cheeks moved to CBS in January 2020. Telegdy left in August 2020 after accusations of racism.
Jeff Shell	2020–2023	Shell was also the CEO of NBCUniversal. Shell was fired in April 2023 after sexual harassment allegations made by Hadley Gamble.
Michael Cavanagh	2023–	

== See also ==
- Lists of NBC television affiliates
- List of NBC personalities
- NBC page
- Olympics on NBC
