= Music Genome Project =

Music description and organization project

The Music Genome Project is a musical analysis project seeking to "capture the essence of music at the most fundamental level" using various attributes to describe songs and mathematics to connect them together into an interactive map. The Music Genome Project covers five music genres: Pop/Rock, Hip-Hop/Electronica, Jazz, World Music, and Classical.

Any given song is represented by approximately 450 "genes" (analogous to trait-determining genes for organisms in the field of genetics). Each gene corresponds to a characteristic of the music, for example, gender of lead vocalist, prevalent use of groove, level of distortion on the electric guitar, type of background vocals, etc. Rock and pop songs have 150 genes, rap songs have 350, and jazz songs have approximately 400. Other genres of music, such as world and classical music, have 300–450 genes. The system depends on a sufficient number of genes to render useful results. Each gene is assigned a number between 0 and 5, in half-integer increments. The Music Genome Project's database is built using a methodology that includes the use of precisely defined terminology, a consistent frame of reference, redundant analysis, and ongoing quality control to ensure that data integrity remains reliably high.

Given the vector of one or more songs, a list of other similar songs is constructed using what the company calls its "matching algorithm". Each song is analyzed by a musician in a process that takes 20 to 30 minutes per song. Ten percent of songs are analyzed by more than one musician to ensure conformity with the in-house standards and statistical reliability.

The Music Genome Project was first conceived by Will Glaser in late 1999, and populated with musicological input from Tim Westergren in early 2000. In January 2000, they joined forces with Jon Kraft to found Savage Beast Technologies to bring their idea to market. The Music Genome Project was developed in its entirety by Pandora Media and remains the core technology used for Pandora Radio, its internet radio service. Although there was a time when the company licensed this technology for use by others, today it is limited for use only by its users.

== Intellectual property ==
"Music Genome Project" is a registered trademark in the United States. The mark is owned by the company Pandora Media, Inc.

The Music Genome Project is covered by U.S. patent 7,003,515 which shows William T. Glaser, Timothy B. Westergren, Jeffrey P. Stearns, and Jonathan M. Kraft as the inventors of this technology. The patent has been assigned to Pandora Media, Inc. With that initial patent filed, most of the intellectual property associated with Glaser's founding algorithm remains a trade secret to this day.

The full list of attributes for individual songs is not publicly released, and ostensibly constitutes a trade secret.

== See also ==
- Moodbar
- MusicBrainz
- Pandora Radio
- WhoSampled
