= Xoom (money transfer service) =

San Francisco-based digital money transfer company

Xoom, A PayPal Service (previously Xoom Corporation)
- Type: Money transfer
- Industry: Financial services
- Founded: 2001; 25 years ago
- Founders: Alan Braverman; Kevin Hartz
- Headquarters: San Francisco, California, U.S.
- Areas served: United States, Canada, Europe, United Kingdom, Australia
- Services: Electronic funds transfer Remittance provider
- Parent: PayPal (2015–present)
- Website: xoom.com

Xoom (previously known as Xoom Corporation) is a digital money transfer service owned by PayPal that enables users to send money internationally to recipients in 160 countries. The service allows individuals in the United States, Canada, the United Kingdom, and select European countries to transfer funds through bank deposit, mobile wallet, and cash pickup options. Xoom also offers international bill payment and mobile phone reloading in select markets.

Xoom was founded in 2001 in San Francisco, California. PayPal acquired the company in November 2015 for approximately $1.09 billion.

== History ==
=== Founding and early development ===
Xoom was founded in 2001 by software developer Alan Braverman and entrepreneur Kevin Hartz, with its headquarters in San Francisco, California. The company initially focused on money transfers to Latin America before expanding to additional corridors in Asia and Europe.

In June 2010, Xoom was included in a study by the Inter-American Dialogue of 79 remittance service providers, which evaluated consumer satisfaction. In March 2011, and September 2012, Xoom was included in The Wall Street Journal's annual "Next Big Thing List" list, which highlights venture-backed companies identified by the publication as notable emerging businesses. In October 2012, a follow-up survey by the Inter-American Dialogue of 51 remittance service providers in the U.S. to Latin America market ranked Xoom among the top providers evaluated for fees and geographic reach.

=== Initial public offering ===
Xoom went public on February 15, 2013, pricing its IPO at $16 per share, above the projected offering range. The company traded on the NASDAQ under the ticker symbol XOOM.

=== Acquisition by PayPal ===
In July 2015, PayPal announced its intention to acquire Xoom Corporation. The transaction was completed in November 2015 for $25 per share, valuing the acquisition at approximately $1.09 billion. Following the acquisition, Xoom operated as a subsidiary of PayPal and was rebranded as Xoom, A PayPal Service.

== Services ==
=== Money transfer ===
Xoom enables users to send money to recipients in 160 countries. Transfers may be funded through a bank account, debit card, credit card, PayPal balance, or PYUSD. Recipients can receive funds through several delivery methods depending on the destination country:

- Bank deposit directly into the recipient's bank account
- Cash pickup at agent locations, including banks, retail outlets, and dedicated money transfer agents in the destination country
- Mobile wallet transfer, including services such as UPI in India and GCash in the Philippines

Verified users may send up to $50,000 per transaction.

== Recognition and awards ==
In 2025 and 2026, Xoom was listed as "Best for convenience" in CNBC Select's annual ranking of international money transfer services.

In March 2011 and September 2012, Xoom appeared on The Wall Street Journal's "Next Big Thing" list of notable emerging venture-backed companies.

The Inter-American Dialogue's 2012 survey of U.S.-to-Latin America remittance providers ranked Xoom among the top providers evaluated for fees and geographic reach.

== Partnerships and sponsorships ==
In 2026, Xoom entered into a sponsorship agreement with the Texas Super Kings, a franchise in Major League Cricket, a professional Twenty20 cricket competition in the United States.

== See also ==
- PayPal
- Western Union
- Remitly
- Wise
- MoneyGram
- Remittance
- Sequoia Capital
- Xoom (web hosting), the original owner of xoom.com
