= Pandora (service) =

American music streaming and recommendation website

- Former names: Savage Beast Technologies (2000-2016)
- Company type: Subsidiary
- Website type: Music streaming service
- Available in: English
- Traded as: NYSE: P (2011-2019)
- Founded: January 2000; 26 years ago
- Headquarters: Oakland, California, U.S.
- No. of locations: 7
- Area served: United States
- Owners: SiriusXM (2019–present)
- Founders: Will Glaser; Jon Kraft; Tim Westergren
- Services: Internet radio
- Employees: 1,938 (2019)
- Subsidiaries: Rdio (acquired (Note: Per details in this article, subsidiaries from before 2019 were acquired by Pandora, thereafter were acquired by Sirius XM and placed in the Pandora portfolio) 2015); AdsWizz (acquired 2018); Simplecast (added 2020); Next Big Sound (added 2021); Stitcher (added 2023)
- Website: www.pandora.com
- Advertising: Banner ads, video ads, audio ads
- Registration: Optional (required to save stations)
- Users: 55.9 million active (2021), 6.4 million subscribers (2021)
- Current status: Active
- Native clients on: Universal Windows App, iOS, Android
- Written in: Java

Pandora is an American subscription-based music streaming service owned by the broadcasting corporation SiriusXM that is based in Oakland, California, United States. The service carries a focus on recommendations based on the "Music Genome Project", which is a means of classifying individual songs by musical traits such as genres and shared instrumentation. The service originally launched in the consumer market as an internet radio service that would generate personalized channels based on these traits as well as specific tracks liked by the user; this service is available in an advertising-supported tier and additionally a subscription-based version. In 2017, the service launched Pandora Premium, which is an on-demand version of the service more in line with contemporary competitors.

The company was founded in 2000 as Savage Beast Technologies, and initially conceived as a business-to-business company licensing the Music Genome Project to retailers as a recommendation platform. In 2005, the company shifted its focus to the consumer market by launching Pandora as an internet radio product. Pandora is a freemium service; basic features are free with advertisements or limitations, while additional features, such as improved streaming quality, music downloads and offline channels are offered via paid subscriptions.

In February 2019, SiriusXM acquired Pandora for $3.5 billion in stock. In 2021, Pandora had about 55.9 million active monthly users, and 6.4 million subscribers. As of 2022, Pandora reportedly had fewer than 50 million active users. As of 2023, there were 46 million users.

== History ==
=== Early history ===
In 2000, Will Glaser, Jon Kraft, and Tim Westergren founded the company as Savage Beast Technologies. Will Glaser had conceptualized the concept of classifying music by various traits and attributes—an effort that he would later name the "Music Genome Project". The company was originally pitched as an e-commerce service that would use Glaser's associated algorithm as a recommendation engine, but this idea was scrapped after the dot-com bubble hit its peak in March 2000. Afterwards, the company pursued licensing the technology to other retailers, such as AOL Music and Best Buy (who used it for in-store kiosks as a trial).

The company faced increasing debt, and ran through its initial $2 million in funding by 2001. Glaser, Kraft, and Westergren then convinced Savage Beast's 50 employees to work for two years without pay, prompting a lawsuit by former employees in 2003 due to deferred salaries being illegal under California law. After settling the suit, just a few employees were laid off. In 2004, based on the success of the Best Buy pilot, Walden Venture Capital led an $8 million round of funding, and hired Joe Kennedy—formerly of automaker Saturn—as its new CEO. After agreements with Best Buy and Borders lapsed, the company began to shift its attention to the consumer market, resulting in the development of Pandora as an internet radio service using the Music Genome Project as a personalization system.

After a beta period, Pandora officially launched in August 2005. Upon its launch, it was a subscription-based service, but added a free, ad-supported version in November after Westergren realized users were abusing its 10-hour free trial by making new e-mail addresses. Advertising could also be targeted based on the current song.

=== Growth ===
In 2011, Pandora went public via an initial public offering on the New York Stock Exchange. At the time, Pandora had 800,000 tracks from 80,000 artists in its library and 80 million users. As of end of mid-year 2018, Pandora had 71.4 million active users.

On March 7, 2013, Pandora chairman and chief executive officer Joseph J. Kennedy announced that he would leave the company after nine years.

In April 2013, Pandora announced that its radio streaming service had 200 million users, including 70 million monthly active users. By December 2013, Pandora accounted for 70% of all internet radio listening in the United States.

On September 1, 2013, Pandora removed a 40-hour-per-month limitation for free mobile listening. As of October 2014, less than 5 percent of active listeners were paying subscribers.

By November 2014, Pandora had approximately doubled its library size, topping 1.5 million songs.

On September 15, 2016, Pandora launched "Pandora Plus", a new $4.99 subscription service to compete with other streaming services.

In early 2017, Pandora revealed that 56 million of its 81 million active users subscribed to the Today's Country station and that country music had accounted for more than 1.7 billion listening hours on the platform in 2016.

On July 31, 2017, Pandora discontinued services in Australia and New Zealand, citing a need to focus solely on the U.S. market.

In September 2017, Roger Lynch became CEO and stated that he wanted to expand the service's focus on podcasts, with similar discovery features to those for music as well as new monetization options. In January 2019, Lynch's departure was announced following the approval of Sirius XM's acquisition of Pandora. Lynch was replaced by Sirius XM CEO Jim Meyer.

On February 26, 2019, Pandora announced the launch of Pandora Stories, a marketing tool for artists. The feature allows artists to build music playlists combined with voice tracks, where they can add a narrative and deeper insights.

In October 2019, Pandora's parent company, Sirius XM, signed a multiyear deal with Marvel to launch a series of superhero-based podcasts in 2020.

=== Acquisitions ===
On June 11, 2013, Pandora announced it would purchase FM radio station KXMZ in Rapid City, South Dakota. On October 7, 2015, Pandora announced it had acquired independent ticketing agency Ticketfly for $450 million, which it subsequently sold to Eventbrite for $200 million on June 9, 2017.

In November 2015, streaming music service Rdio, founded by Skype co-founders Janus Friis and Niklas Zennström, declared bankruptcy and sold its assets to Pandora for $75 million. Pandora retained 100 Rdio employees, including Iain Morris and Rich Masio, who joined a growing licensing department in pursuit of direct licenses with labels and publishers.

In March 2018, Pandora announced it would acquire digital audio ad technology firm AdsWizz for $145 million.

In February 2019, SiriusXM acquired Pandora for $3.5 billion in stock. In June 2020, Sirius XM acquired podcast service provider Simplecast, pairing it with AdsWizz within its Pandora portfolio.

In July 2020, Sirius XM acquired Stitcher for $325 million. Following the acquisition, Sirius XM integrated Stitcher's exclusive podcasts into its additional music and podcast listening service, Pandora. At the peak of its popularity, Stitcher was reported to have nearly 14.5 million weekly users.

In 2022, Sirius XM acquired Cloud Cover Media, Inc, which handles music for businesses, and merged it with Pandora to form Pandora Cloudcover.

== Features ==
=== Streaming ===
Listeners can tune into established genre stations, other users' stations or create their own stations based on their musical interests. The user can use thumbs up and thumbs down buttons to declare whether they like a track or not, which determines whether similar songs should be played in the station. A second thumbs down to the same artist will ban that artist from the selected station. A thumbs down immediately skips a song, but the number of times a user can skip tracks is limited unless they are using one of the paid subscription plans, or opts to watch a video ad. More than 450 musical attributes are considered when selecting the next song. These 450 attributes are combined into larger groups called focus traits, of which there are 2,000. Examples of these are rhythm syncopation, key tonality, and vocal harmonies.

Pandora is available in a free advertising-supported service, and a subscription-based tier known as "Pandora Plus" (rebranded from "Pandora One" in September 2015), which also features offline playback support using a prediction mechanism, and more skips and replays.

In March 2017, a third tier known as "Pandora Premium" was launched, which allows users to listen to and create playlists of individual songs on-demand (making it more in line with competing services such as Apple Music and Spotify). The recommendation engine can also be used to generate playlists of similar songs. Pandora also emphasized a use of machine learning and manual curation, including filtering out low-quality content such as "knock-off covers" and karaoke tracks.

In October 2019, Pandora added full song credits to their app, displaying the data on who contributed to which song.

=== Limitations ===
Initially, users with free accounts could listen to 40 hours of music a month, and could pay $0.99 per month for unlimited streaming. In September 2011, Pandora removed the 40-hour listening limit. This 40-hour limit on free listening was re-introduced in March 2013 for mobile devices. However, this limit was removed once more in September of the same year.

In September 2016, a rewind function was introduced allowing users to replay a song. The updated streaming service also allowed users to skip an unidentified number of additional songs per hour if they opted to watch an ad. Previous to that, users were only able to skip six songs in an hour.

== Device support ==
Pandora apps are available for Android and iOS. Apps are also available for Apple Watch and Wear OS smartwatches. An app for the Pebble smartwatch platform was also available before that platform was discontinued. Integrations have also been offered with smart speakers. Support for voice control was added to the mobile apps in January 2019.

== Business model ==
In the three months that ended October 31, 2011, advertising comprised 88% of Pandora's total revenues; that was reported as 80% in December 2013. RPM (revenue per thousands of hours) is determined based on CPMs (cost per thousand impressions). CPMs are largely dependent upon network effects and thus increase as a website scales and adds users. As such, Pandora's strategy in order to allow for widespread distribution was to offer a service unbundled from devices and transport. Pandora also works with system-on-chip manufacturers to embed its technologies on the chips they sell to consumer electronics manufacturers like Panasonic, Samsung, and Sony.

Pandora's cost structure is highly variable, with content acquisition costs representing roughly 50% of total costs. There are three main costs associated with content acquisition. First, SoundExchange collects content fees on behalf of labels or artists on the recording themselves. These are by far the largest content acquisition costs. Second, Pandora pays licensing fees to agencies such as BMI, ASCAP, or SESAC in order to compensate composers, songwriters and publishers. Lastly, Pandora also pays TiVo Corporation for song and artist information; this has recently been structured as a flat monthly fee.

High variable costs mean that Pandora does not have significant operating leverage, and in the next couple years might actually have negative operating leverage due to an unfavorable shift in product mix towards mobile. Pandora is currently estimated to monetize mobile hours at roughly one-ninth the rate of desktop hours. Since Pandora pays the same licensing cost per hour irrespective of the user's platform, the net contribution to earnings per mobile hour is even more skewed with respect to contribution to earnings from desktop hours. Mobile revenues will improve over time as Pandora shifts from relying on third-party ad networks to selling ad inventory internally at premium rates.

In January 2011, Pandora met with investment banks to consider a possible $100 million IPO. The company filed with the SEC for a $100mm IPO on February 11, 2011, and officially began trading on the New York Stock Exchange with ticker symbol "P" on June 15, 2011, at a price of $16/share. This gave them a valuation of nearly $2.6 billion.

Pandora announced $80.8 million in total revenue for their first quarter of fiscal 2012, which was up 58% over their previous year Q1 results. Of the $80.8 million, $70.6 million came from advertising, while the other $10.2 million came from subscription. In addition, Pandora has seen a 62% advertising revenue increase, and a 38% subscription revenue increase year-over-year. However, the vast majority of Pandora's users remain on the free, ad-supported model.

== Royalties ==
Pandora's business model was threatened by changes to royalty structures affecting internet radio in the United States, with the Copyright Royalty Board having ordered increases to per-song performance royalties (which are not paid by terrestrial radio) in March 2007. Pandora was a member of an industry group, SaveNetRadio, which opposed the increases. In August 2008, Westergen told The Washington Post that they were "approaching a pull-the-plug kind of decision", arguing that "the moment we think this problem in Washington is not going to get solved, we have to pull the plug because all we're doing is wasting money."

On July 7, 2009, SoundExchange announced that agreements had been reached on royalty rates for internet radio, with larger webcasters paying a minimum of 25% of total revenue or rates per-song per-listener, whichever is higher. Pandora described the new rates as being "a middle ground that, while perhaps not meeting all of our aspirations, still represents a thoughtful and reasoned outcome under the circumstances." Due to the new rates still being relatively high in comparison to terrestrial radio, Pandora announced that ad-supported service would be limited to 40 hours per-month, and that users would be required to pay a $0.99 fee (separate from the Pandora One subscription, which is ad-free) to receive unlimited listening for the remainder of the month With an update to the Pandora player in September 2011, the 40 hour cap was extended to 320 hours.

On November 22, 2011, Pandora reported its Q3 earnings. Royalty costs accounted for 50% of revenue, slightly better than expected. Its revenue, most of it from advertising, continued to rise at respectable rates. Not only has Pandora attracted more users but the average number of hours per user have also increased. Pandora now accounts for an estimated 4% of total US listening hours. As Pandora grows, it hopes to gain leverage on music labels and drive royalty costs down.

Pandora CEO Tim Westergren has supported The Internet Radio Fairness Act or IRFA (H.R. 6480/S. 3609), which would reduce the company's royalty payments to the performers by 80 percent.

On November 5, 2012, Pandora filed suit in federal district court against ASCAP over royalty fees. In the suit, the company sought to advocate for lower licensing fees on all the songs represented by the ASCAP's 435,000 members. On February 27, 2013, Pandora announced a 40-hour-per-month limit on free mobile listening. Pandora CEO Tim Westergren cited escalating royalty costs as the reason for the mobile cap.

In a ruling made public in March 2014, US District Judge Denise Cote ruled that Pandora's rate paid to ASCAP should remain the same, 1.85%. She cited (p. 97) "troubling coordination" between two of the biggest publishing companies (Sony and UMPG) and ASCAP that alludes to core antitrust concern in the industry.

After arguing that both ASCAP and BMI were showing bias towards international broadcasters who own terrestrial radio stations, Pandora announced on June 11, 2013, that it would attempt to acquire KXMZ, a radio station in Rapid City, South Dakota, under the presumption that doing so would allow it to access the same preferential licensing terms offered to services such as iHeartRadio (which is owned by IHeartMedia, itself America's largest radio broadcaster). The move was criticized by David Israelite, CEO of the National Music Publishers' Association, who declared that Pandora was now "at war with songwriters," and had lost its credibility because it was resorting to "lawsuits and gimmicks" to make its point. However, a member of Public Knowledge praised the move, by stating that it was "a perfect example of the twisted incentives and strange results we get from a music licensing system that is based on who wants a license instead of just what they want to do with the music they’re using." ASCAP also objected to the deal, filing a petition to deny with the FCC. The organization argued that the acquisition was not in the public interest because of Pandora's intent to use it as a "bargaining chip" for royalty payments. ASCAP also alleged that Pandora did not provide enough information about its ownership structure, failing to prove that less than 25% of the company was owned by foreign interests. On January 14, 2014, the FCC denied the acquisition until Pandora "demonstrate[s] adequate support for its foreign ownership compliance certification." The FCC relented in 2015 and allowed Pandora to acquire the station under the premise that whatever foreign ownership Pandora had was widely dispersed; Two years later, Pandora would sell the station to Rapid City-based Haugo Broadcasting for $300,000.

In July 2013, David Lowery, the frontman of the rock bands Cracker and Camper Van Beethoven, wrote an article criticizing Pandora's royalty rate for Cracker's song "Low", which was streamed over one million times. According to his BMI royalty statement, Lowery earned only $16.89 for his 40 percent stake in the song.

On September 1, 2013, Pandora removed the 40-hour-per-month limit on free mobile listening (originally announced on February 27, 2013). Pandora stated that it was able to make this change "thanks to the rapid progress of its mobile advertising."

In 2014, Pandora signed an agreement with some music copyright owners for lower royalties in exchange for more frequent streaming of songs. Though not illegal, this practice raised comparisons to payola, which is illegal payment for airplay on terrestrial radio.

== Reception ==
In 2013, Entertainment Weekly compared a number of music services and granted Pandora a "B−", writing, "Free streaming radio, $36 a year for ad-free. Launched in 2005, Pandora is available on just about every platform. There's no on-demand, though, and stations tend to draw from a relatively small pool of albums." As of March 2014, the annual option was eliminated, and the $3.99 monthly plan was the only way to get Pandora One. The price rose to $4.99 a month in July 2014. The annual subscription was brought back and is now $54.89 a year.

== Advertising ==
Pandora initially offered a subscription-only service without commercials. However, the idea of paying did not sit well with most U.S. consumers and the company had to consider alternative business models to offer a free service. Then, in December 2005 Pandora sold its first advertisement.

In 2015, Pandora began playing more advertisements per hour in certain geographies and demographics. Pandora normally plays no more than six advertisements per hour for free users.

=== Revenue ===
Pandora became fairly popular within just two years. Starting from 2010 to 2012 Pandora's registered users had increased from 45 million to 125 million. The company's revenue increased from $55 million to $274 million, in which a majority of it from advertising. In order to appeal to a large audience of consumers, Pandora offers ad-free access for $36 a year. During its 2011 fiscal year, Pandora reported $138 million in revenue with a $1.8 million net loss, excluding the cost of a special dividend associated with the IPO. Overall, Pandora has a 78% of Internet radio and a 9.3% share of the U.S. public radio. Finally, in 2013 industry-wide total radio ad revenue increased to $17.6 billion in the US.

=== Pitch to advertisers ===
Pandora obtains its advertisers by explaining that the company reaches a narrower audience compared to terrestrial radio. "Pandora's pitch to advertisers is that its technology can cater to consumers with far greater precision than radio – it can pinpoint listeners by age and sex, ZIP code or even musical taste."

=== Methods of advertising ===
There are a few different methods of advertising on Pandora. Audio advertising comes in spots of 15 to 30 seconds, and run once every 20 minutes. However, users only encounter ads if they are engaging with the site, like contributing a thumbs up or a thumbs down when changing a song or station.

Next, there are banner ads which are featured on the wallpaper of the site. As noted by the New York Times, banner ads are on Pandora in order "to promote engagement, audio segments can be accompanied by clickable display ads offering coupons or product information.

Advertising on Pandora works through a method of collecting data from users' online browsing activity. Once the data is collected, the company uses the data to show the user target ads. This process of advertising is also known as behavioral advertising. Pandora offers its users the option of submitting out of the targeted ads, by an opt-out configuration on its website. Opting-out will only prevent targeted ads, meaning users may continue to see generic (non-targeted ads) from these companies after they opt-out. Eventually, Pandora offers either targeted advertisements or generic advertisements for its non-subscribed users. However, Pandora's advertising does not offer local content such as the local news, weather, traffic, and talk.

=== Market segments ===
Pandora has created two market segments, one for Spanish listeners, and another for English listeners. By creating multiple market segments, Pandora's advertising is customized to its users' needs. In order to create the first two market segments, the company cross-referenced its registered user data with the United States census. Then, the cross reference allows the company to identify zip codes with high populations of Hispanic and Spanish-speaking people, and finally it ran tests overlaying the two data sets to infer which listeners fit into those buckets.

== See also ==
- List of Internet radio stations
- List of online music databases
- List of streaming media systems
