= Craft Ventures =

American venture capital firm

Craft Ventures LLC
- Type: Private
- Industry: Venture capital
- Founded: 2017; 9 years ago
- Founders: David O. Sacks; Bill Lee
- Headquarters: San Francisco, US
- Products: Venture capital
- Total assets: $850 million
- Website: craftventures.com

Craft Ventures LLC is an American venture capital firm based in San Francisco which makes early stage venture investments. Craft was founded in 2017 by David O. Sacks and Bill Lee.

== Background ==
Craft was founded in 2017 by David O. Sacks, formerly of Yammer and PayPal and Bill Lee, formerly of Remarq and Big Fish Games. Jeff Fluhr, founder and former CEO of StubHub, joined as a general partner in 2018 and Sky Dayton, founder of EarthLink and Boingo Wireless, joined as venture partner the same year.

Craft announced its first fund of $350 million in January 2018 and its second fund of $500M in October 2019.

== Funds ==
Craft Ventures I ($350 million) was raised in 2017.

Craft Ventures II ($500 million) was raised in 2019.

In August 2021, Craft announced the closing of Craft Ventures III ($612 million) and Craft Ventures Growth I ($510 million), focusing on SaaS businesses and marketplace businesses.

In November 2023, Craft announced the closing of Craft Ventures IV ($712 million) and Craft Ventures Growth II ($608 million).

== Notable exits ==
| Company | Year of investment | Investment type | Exit |
|---|---|---|---|
| CloudKitchens | 2017 | Series A (Co-Lead) | Acquired by 10100 in 2019 |
| Harbor | 2017 | Seed | Acquired by BitGo in February 2020 |
| Lumina | 2018 | Seed (Lead) | Acquired by BitGo in April 2020 |
