= Jake Winebaum =

American entrepreneur (born 1959)

- Born: 1959 (age 66–67)
- Occupation: Businessman
- Known for: Founder of FamilyFun magazine, Business.com, Brighter.com and co-founder of eCompanies
- Spouse: Cindy Weston
- Relatives: Stanley Weston (father-in-law)

Jake Winebaum (born 1959) is an American entrepreneur. Winebaum is the founder of FamilyFun magazine, Business.com, Brighter.com and co-founder of eCompanies and Applied Cognition.

== Early life and education ==
Winebaum’s father, Sumner, was an advertising executive with Young & Rubicam in New York and Europe; and his mother, Helen (née Auerbach), was a stage and television actress. Shortly after his birth in New York City, the family moved to London, Milan and Paris before settling in Exeter, New Hampshire.

Winebaum attended Phillips Exeter Academy and Dartmouth College, where he majored in Biology and Creative Writing and graduated cum laude in 1981. He also won the Grimes Senior Writing Prize. At Dartmouth, Winebaum played three sports, soccer, lacrosse and alpine skiing.

== Career ==
=== Early career ===
While at Dartmouth in 1980, Winebaum started his first business, Same Day Fish Company. He spent summers throughout high school and college working on fishing boats and started a fish processing and distribution business delivering fish and lobsters to restaurants and supermarkets throughout Northern New England.

He started his professional career at Fortune magazine in 1982. He then moved to Time magazine in 1983, and U.S. News & World Report in 1985 where he was instrumental in the turnaround of the magazine and in the development of the series of special issues, including USNews Best Colleges. He and his wife Cindy started FamilyFun magazine with their own funds in 1991. The magazine was named one of AdWeek’s Hot 5 list of magazines for 1992. Winebaum sold the magazine to the Walt Disney Company in 1992.

=== The Walt Disney Company ===
While at Disney, Winebaum founded FamilyPC magazine in 1994. The same year, he compiled the business plan for The Walt Disney Company’s Internet initiatives which he subsequently led. In 1995, Winebaum was named president of Disney Online. As president of Disney Online, and later as Chairman of Buena Vista Internet Group, he oversaw all of Disney’s Internet businesses, including Disney.com, ABCNews.com and ESPN.com.

=== eCompanies ===
Winebaum left Disney in 1999 to co-found eCompanies, a privately held Internet incubator and venture fund, with EarthLink founder Sky Dayton. The company reportedly struggled for a time when the dot-com bubble burst, but ultimately launched and funded additional companies. Such businesses included LowerMyBills.com, which was purchased by Experian in 2005, JAMDAT Mobile, which went public and was then purchased by Electronic Arts, Boingo Wireless, which went public in 2011, USBX which was purchased by Imperial Capital, and Business.com which was purchased by RH Donnelly in 2007. Winebaum served as CEO of Business.com from 2002 until its sale in 2007.

=== Brighter ===
In January 2010, Winebaum founded Brighter. Brighter is an online dental care resource. Cigna acquired Brighter in December 2017 and, as part of the transaction, Winebaum became Cigna's Chief Digital Officer.

=== Applied Cognition ===
Winebaum co-founded Applied Cognition with Paul Dagum in December 2020 where he serves as Executive Chairman. The company is developing a device and health management platform to treat and prevent age-related decline in cognitive function.

== Other activities and awards ==
Winebaum serves on the board of directors of Vision to Learn and the Wood Island Life Saving Station and was Founding Chairman of Seven Arrows Elementary School.

Jake was named E&Y's 2018 Technology Entrepreneur of the Year in Los Angeles. Jake's expertise and contributions to the Internet industry have been recognized by the Los Angeles Venture Association which inducted him into its Hall of Fame in 2010, Time magazine, which awarded him a place in the Top 50 Cyber Elite, and Wired Magazine, which named him one of the Wired 25.

== Personal life ==
Winebaum participates in endurance cycling and running events and Masters ski racing. He has competed in the Leadville 100, Transalp Challenge mountain bike races, Tour Transalp, and Everest Challenge road bike races multiple times, and placed 6th in the 2008 National Masters Ski Championships. In 1986, he married Cindy Weston, daughter of G.I. Joe inventor Stanley Weston; they have 2 children.

== Interviews ==
- Interview with Jake Winebaum, Brighter (2011) With Benjamin F. Kuo
- Kara Visits Business.com’s Jake Winebaum (2007) With Kara Swisher
- Jake Winebaum, CEO, Business.com (2004) With Susan Kuchinskas
- Interview With Jake Winebaum, CEO of Business.com (2007) SocalTech
- Interview With Jake Winebaum, Founder of eCompanies (2000) SocalTech
