= Business.com =

Digital advertising company

Business.com Media, Inc.
- Type: Corporation
- Industry: Performance Based Marketing
- Founded: 1999; 27 years ago
- Founder: Jake Winebaum; Sky Dayton
- Headquarters: Los Angeles, California, U.S.
- Website: www.business.com

Business.com is a digital media company and B2B web destination which offers various performance marketing advertising, including lead generation products on a pay per lead and pay per click basis, directory listings, and display advertising. The site covers business industry news and trends for growth companies and the B2B community to stay up-to-date, and hosted more than 15,000 pieces of content as of November 2014. Business.com operates as a subsidiary of the Purch Group since being acquired in 2016.

Having sold their brands to Future, Purch's existing B2B assets later reorganised into Business.com.

== History ==
Business.com, Inc. was founded in 1999 by Jake Winebaum, previously chairman of the Walt Disney Internet Group; and Sky Dayton, founder of Earthlink, Boingo Wireless, and Helio, among others. Around that time, the Business.com domain name was purchased from Marc Ostrofsky by Winebaum's eCompanies Ventures for $7.5 million. In addition to investment by eCompanies, early funding in the amount of $61 million was provided in 2000 by Pearson PLC, Reed Business Information, McGraw Hill, and others. In its initial form, Business.com aimed to be the Internet's leading search engine for small business and corporate information.

Business.com struggled through the Dot-com bubble years. The company retooled beginning in 2002 after massive layoffs and a new focus on developing a pay for performance ad network model. In April 2003, the company achieved profitability, and on November 8, 2004, the company secured an additional $10 million in venture capital funding from Benchmark Capital.

Having purchased the domain in 2001, Business.com launched Work.com on October 9, 2006. The site included business how-to guides contributed by the small business community. Work.com was sold in March 2012 and is now a corporate performance management platform owned by Salesforce.

Then on July 26, 2007, after beating out Dow Jones & Company, the New York Times Company, IAC/InterActiveCorp, and News Corp, print and interactive marketing company R.H. Donnelley Corporation announced plans to acquire Business.com in a deal valued at $345 million. The deal closed on August 23, 2007.

In June 2009, R.H. Donnelley filed for bankruptcy. The company emerged from Chapter 11 as Dex One Corporation on February 1, 2010. In February 2011, Resource Nation acquired the brand and associated assets of Business.com. JMI Equity provided funding in support of the transaction.

In January 2013, the appointment of Tony Uphoff as CEO was announced. In March 2013, Business.com launched a site refresh, new logo and new suite of products. New content management, analytics, and big data platforms were introduced in August 2014.

In June 2016, Business.com was acquired by Purch Group. When Future plc acquired Purch's consumer properties in 2018, Business.com was not included and was instead spun off as an independent company.

== Products ==
Business.com serves advertisers looking to reach small and mid-sized business. Advertising customers include some of the largest B2B brands in B2B such as Intel, Salesforce, Marketo, ADP, Sprint as well as smaller brands. Its suite of digital marketing products include display advertising, pay per click, email marketing, content marketing demand generation, and lead generation for sales ready leads.

In December, 2014, the company launched LENS, a lead expansion and nurturing service, as part of their demand generation product set.

== Awards and recognition ==
Business.com has been named as a Best Place to Work by the San Diego Business Journal in 2012, 2013, 2014. In October 2014, the website was ranked #1 on Inc.com's '50 Websites Your Startup Needs to Succeed'.
