= David Hagan =

American businessman

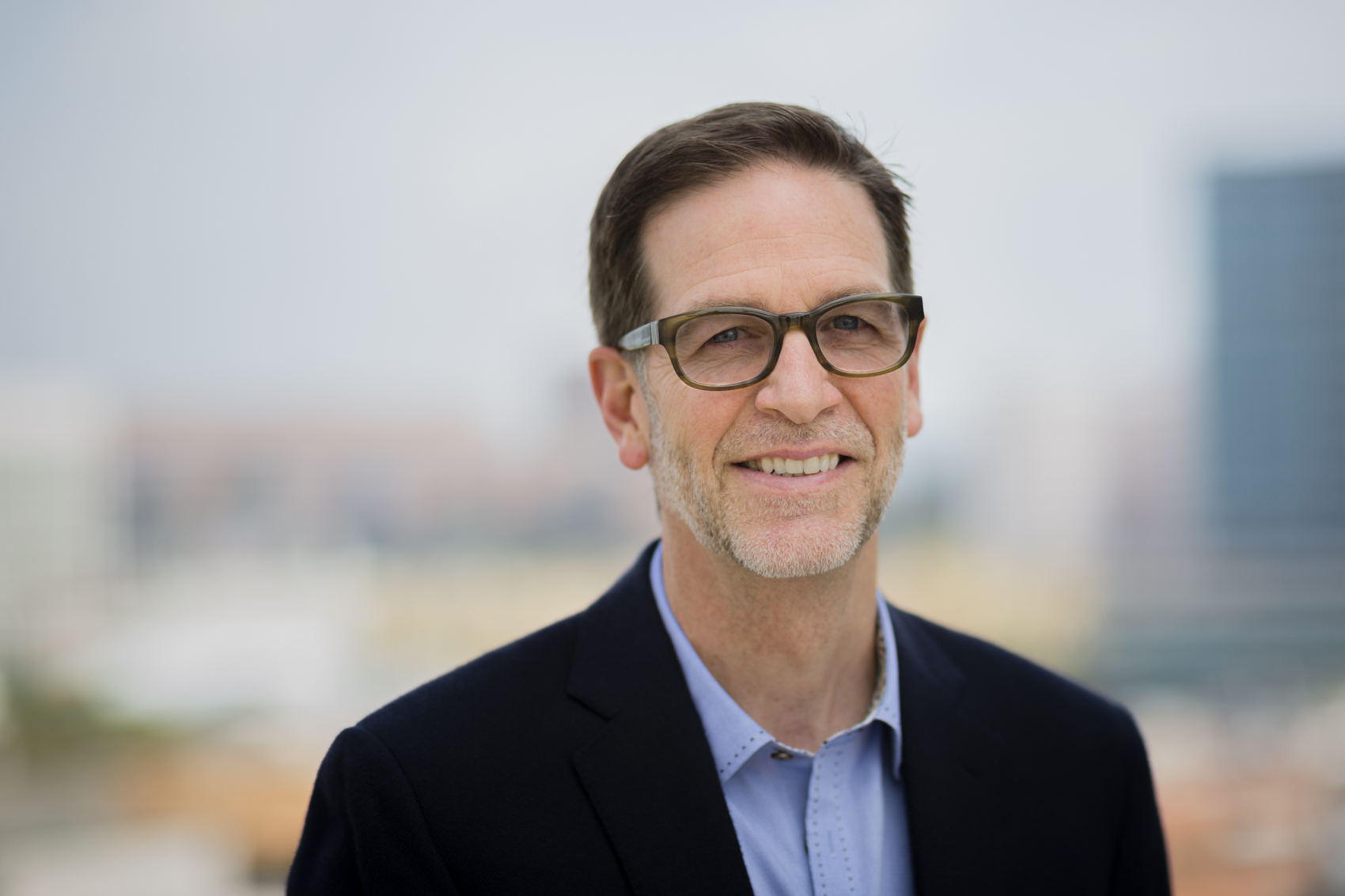
- Education: University of Kansas, Baker University
- Occupation: Former CEO of Boingo Wireless
- Known for: CEO of Boingo Wireless; Chairman of the Executive Board for the Consumer Technology Association

David Hagan was the former Chief Executive of Global Wi-Fi solutions company Boingo Wireless. He was the company's President since 2001 and was appointed CEO in 2004. He retired as CEO in March 2019.

== Education ==
David is a graduate of the University of Kansas and obtained an MBA from Baker University.

== Career ==
Hagan began his career working for a Midwest advertising agency, and one of his first clients was United Telecom, the predecessor of long distance company Sprint. Sprint hired him a few years later, and he spent 15 years with the company.

An interest in the Internet led him to join InterActiveCorp (IAC), an internet commerce company led by Barry Diller. Hagan was COO and President of TicketMaster and Citysearch, the first online city guide.

Hagan joined Boingo Wireless in 2001 as President. When company founder Sky Dayton left in 2004, Hagan succeeded him as CEO.

In September 2016, Hagan was named Chairman of the Executive Board for the Consumer Technology Association, the group that hosts CES. He served as Chair until October 2018.

In March 2019, Hagan retired as CEO of Boingo, and reportedly continued as a member of the company's board.
