= Matt Coffin =

- Education: Babson College
- Occupations: Entrepreneur, investor
- Height: 6 ft 6 in (1.98 m)

Matt Coffin is an internet entrepreneur and investor. He is the founder and was the president of LowerMyBills.com, which was sold to Experian in 2005 for $380 million. He was also the president of Experian Online Customer Acquisition Services.

== Life and career ==
Coffin graduated from Babson College in 1990 and was named to the Alumni Entrepreneur Hall of Fame in 2009 by the Arthur M. Blank Center for Entrepreneurship. He was an Ernst and Young Entrepreneur of Year award winner in 2007 and Southern California Entrepreneur of the Year in 2006.

Coffin also sat on the board of directors for Business.com, which was started by incubator eCompanies, whose venture arm was an early investor in LowerMyBills.com. He also invested in both Buscape, which was sold in October 2009 for $330M, and HauteLook, which was sold to Nordstrom in February 2011 for $270M.

He currently sits on the board of directors for eBureau Machinima, and Mahalo.
