= Sky Dayton =

American entrepreneur and investor (born 1971)

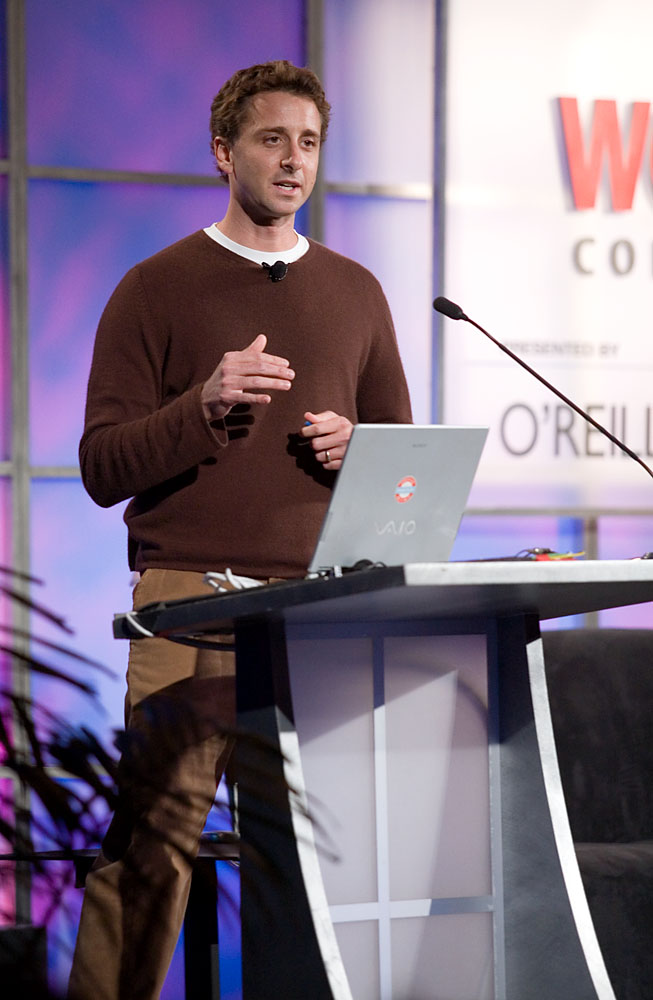
- at the Web 2.0 Conference, 2005
- Born: August 8, 1971 (age 55); New York City, New York
- Occupation: Entrepreneur
- Known for: EarthLink, eCompanies, Boingo, City Storage Systems, CloudKitchens
- Spouse: Arwen Elys Dayton
- Relatives: Sam DeWitt (great-grandfather)

Sky Dylan Dayton (born August 8, 1971) is an American entrepreneur and investor. He is the founder of Internet service provider EarthLink, co-founder of eCompanies, the founder of Boingo, and co-founder of City Storage Systems and CloudKitchens.

== Early life ==
Dayton's father was the sculptor Wendell Dayton, and his mother is Alice Pero, a poet and flutist. Shortly after his birth in New York City, the family moved to Los Angeles. He lived for a time with his maternal grandfather, David DeWitt, an IBM Fellow, who played a large part in introducing Dayton to technology.

At the age of 9, he got his first computer, a ZX81, which he used to learn programming in BASIC. At 16, Dayton graduated from The Delphian School, a private boarding school in Oregon, which uses study methods developed by L. Ron Hubbard. He wanted to be an animator but was rejected when he applied to CalArts (the California Institute of the Arts), saying he was too young at the time. Instead, Dayton got an entry-level job at a Burbank, California, advertising firm and three months later headed the graphics department. He moved to a larger advertising agency, Mednick & Associates, where he held a similar role until he was 18.

== Career ==
=== Early career ===
MIT Technology Review described Dayton as "...a high-school graduate who started up a West Hollywood, Calif., coffeehouse before getting into the Internet business." That coffeehouse was Cafe Mocha (originally called Mocha Gallery), which Dayton started with a friend in 1990, at age 19, after raising money from family and friends. While managing Cafe Mocha, Dayton and Adam Wicks Walker opened Dayton/Walker Design in 1992, a Studio City advertising and design firm, serving entertainment clients including Fox Television, Disney, Columbia Pictures, Sony Pictures, and Warner Brothers.

In 1993, after initially having great difficulties getting his Macintosh computer to access the Internet, Dayton said that he realized the Internet was likely to become the next mass communications medium. In an article in Vanity Fair, Dayton described his earliest interest in the Internet and its business potential:

I heard about this thing called the Internet. I thought, That sounds kind of interesting. The first thing I did is I actually picked up the phone and dialed 411, and I said, I’d like the number for the Internet, please. And the operator is like, What? I said, Just search any company with the word Internet in the name. Blank. Nothing. I thought, Wow, this is interesting. What is this thing anyway?

— Sky Dayton

=== 1990s: EarthLink ===
In 1994, Dayton founded EarthLink, an Internet service provider (ISP) that would offer Internet access to the public. Kevin O'Donnell, father of a childhood friend, and Reed Slatkin became EarthLink's first financial backers. Other investors followed, including Greg B. Abbott, former AT&T CFO Robert Kavner, Chip Lacy, and eventually larger investors such as George Soros.

EarthLink started in a small office of 600 square feet (56 m^{2}) in Los Angeles, California. By the summer of 1995, EarthLink reached an agreement with UUNET allowing it to provide service nationwide. In 1995, Dayton introduced the first flat-rate service, at a time when AOL was still charging by the hour. By 1996, the company was growing at a rate of 5–10% a week. Dayton transitioned his title from founding CEO to executive chairman, handing over day-to-day operations of the company to Charles "Garry" Betty. A long-time Mac user, Dayton led the creation of a strategic partnership with Steve Jobs at Apple in 1998 that made EarthLink the default ISP pre-loaded on the iMac. This arrangement led to a $200 million investment by Apple in EarthLink. EarthLink became the second largest U.S. Internet service provider, after AOL, with more than four million customers and over $1 billion in annual revenue.

=== Early 2000s ===
In June 1999, Dayton left day-to-day operations at EarthLink and went on to launch four other companies, including eCompanies, Boingo, Jamdat, Helio, and Business.com.

He formed eCompanies, an incubator and venture capital fund for developing Internet companies, with former Disney Internet chief Jake Winebaum. A privately held company, eCompanies successfully launched LowerMyBills.com, which was purchased by Experian in 2005 for $380 million and JAMDAT Mobile, which went public and was then purchased by Electronic Arts in 2005 for $680 million. Dayton and eCompanies made headlines by buying the Business.com domain name for $7.5 million in 1999, believed to be the highest price ever paid for a domain at the time, during the height of the dot com bubble; they later sold the Business.com search portal to RH Donnelly in 2007 for $345 million.

In 2001, Dayton started Boingo Wireless to address what he saw as a fragmentation problem inherent in Wi-Fi networks. Boingo aggregates Wi-Fi hotspots around the globe into a single network, and has grown into one of the largest Wi-Fi operators. Boingo filed for its IPO in January 2011, listing Dayton as owning 15% of the company. On May 4, 2011, Boingo Wireless went public selling 5,770,000 shares at $13.50, raising $77.9 million. Dayton served as Boingo's chairman until August, 2014.

In 2005, Dayton became CEO of Helio, a mobile phone joint venture of EarthLink and SK Telecom, formed with $220 million in funding from each company. At that time, Dayton resigned as chairman of EarthLink but remained a director. In January 2008, he was appointed Chairman of Helio's board of directors for the months leading up to Helio's acquisition by Virgin Mobile USA in June, 2008.

=== Recent ===
Dayton is a board member of the digital education company Age of Learning, which raised $150 million in 2016 at a $1 billion valuation, and $300 million in July 2021, giving the company a $3 billion valuation.

He is an investor in and board member of Diffbot, a semantic web and structured data startup, and Artsy, an online art marketplace, which raised a reported $50 million in July 2017.

Dayton was an early investor in video doorbell company Ring, which was acquired by Amazon in February, 2017 for $1 billion.

He is an investor in Joby Aviation, a NASA LeapTech participant building an electric vertical take-off and landing aircraft, which raised $100 million from Intel, JetBlue and Toyota in February, 2018 and went public in August 2021, at a value of $6.6 billion.

Dayton is a co-founder of City Storage Systems and CloudKitchens, a ghost kitchen and technology company, which in March 2018, secured a $150 million investment from Uber founder Travis Kalanick, who also joined the company as its CEO. CloudKitchens' valuation in January 2019 was $5 billion; in November 2021, it reached $15 billion. In February 2019, Kalanick announced plans to expand into China. Kalanick remains actively involved in CloudKitchens, shaping the company's long-term strategy. CloudKitchens has grown from a handful of sites to an international operation spanning the United States, Latin America, and Europe. Other early investors in CloudKitchens include Jason Calacanis and Chamath Palihapitiya.

City Storage Systems, the parent company of CloudKitchens, buys "distressed" properties and converts them into spaces equipped for online retail, specifically food delivery.

In January 2019, Dayton led the Series A investment in micro satellite startup Swarm Technologies, along with PayPal co-founder David Sacks. About the investment, Dayton said, “Swarm’s approach reminds me of the early years at EarthLink—stay super scrappy, serve customers and generate revenue quickly.” Swarm was acquired by SpaceX in August 2021, in a transaction described as "a rare deal by Elon Musk’s space company that expands the team — and possibly the technological capabilities — of its growing Starlink internet service," with Swarm co-founders Sara Spangelo and Benjamin Longmier both coming aboard as SpaceX executives.

Dayton is a jet-rated pilot and has taken a personal and a business interest in improving pilot training and aviation safety. In December 2022, Dayton invested in Loft Dynamics. The Swiss startup creates virtual reality simulation technology for pilots, and raised $20 million in funding from venture capital firms including Sky Dayton, Craft Ventures, which Dayton runs with co-investors David Sacks, Bill Lee, and Jeff Fluhr, and Up Ventures.

In July 2025, satellite firm Xona Space Systems received $92 million in new funding for its fleet of positioning satellites, including its Series B round led by Craft Ventures. Dayton will join Xona's board as part of the new funding.

== Politics and social advocacy ==
In Walter Isaacon’s biography Elon Musk, Dayton is referred to as a "fellow libertarian". Dayton has listed authors Henry Hazlitt, Frederic Bastiat, and Ayn Rand as significant influences, stating, "It never occurred to me to go to the government for a solution. It seems barbaric. A medieval solution to a Net-age problem."

In 2011, he co-hosted an event to support then Deputy Mayor and Independent candidate Austin Beutner in the 2013 Los Angeles mayoral election.

== Other activities and awards ==
He was chosen as Entrepreneur of the Year in 1999 by the Lloyd Greif Center at the USC Marshall School of Business. In 1999, Dayton was named to the MIT Technology Review TR100, a list of the top 100 innovators in the world under the age of 35, and in 2010 was a recipient of the Dream Keeper award from the I Have a Dream Foundation.

In 2007, Dayton served on the advisory board of the Center for Public Leadership at the John F. Kennedy School of Government at Harvard University. Since at least 2019, Dayton has served on the Parents' Advisory Board of Stanford University.

== Personal life ==
Dayton is an avid surfer and poker player.

Dayton is married to novelist Arwen Elys Dayton. They have three children and live in the Pacific Northwest.
