= WiFiFee =

WiFiFee, LLC.
- Company type: Limited Liability Company
- Industry: telecommunications
- Founded: 2002
- Headquarters: Menands, New York
- Key people: Brian Epstein, CEO
- Products: Internet services, Wi-Fi, Municipal wireless network, MDU Wi-Fi, wireless mesh network, Wireless security
- Number of employees: 4 (January, 2008)

Founded in 2002, WiFiFee, LLC. is a Wi-Fi broadband internet access provider, based in Menands, New York. WiFiFee specializes in providing high-speed wireless Wi-Fi Internet access to end-users at residential communities (MDU/MTU), hotels, condominiums, resorts, RV Parks, airports and shopping malls.

In order to compete in the free-use Wi-Fi model, WiFiFee recently created the WiFiFree brand.

WiFiFee has most recently partnered with Boingo Wireless to allow Boingo's users to roam at WiFiFee hotspots like Albany International Airport.

WiFiFee also operates a wholly owned subsidiary, Tech Valley Wireless, in New York's Tech Valley region.

As of November 2013, WiFiFee has a Better Business Bureau Reliability Rating of B+.

== Notable projects ==
- Albany, NY's first public-access Wi-Fi provider.
- WiFiFee helps Albany reach Intel's "Top Unwired Cities" list.
- Troy, NY Waterfront Wi-Fi Project.
