= BBC America =

American pay television network

- Country: United States
- Broadcast area: Nationwide
- Headquarters: New York City, United States

Programming
- Language: English
- Picture format: 1080i HDTV (downscaled to letterboxed 480i for the SDTV feed)

Ownership
- Owner: AMC Global Media
- Sister channels: AMC; IFC; Sundance TV; We TV

History
- Launched: March 29, 1998; 28 years ago

Links
- Website: bbcamerica.com

Availability

Streaming media
- Service(s): DirecTV Stream, Philo, Sling TV, YouTube TV

BBC America is an American basic cable network owned by AMC Global Media. The channel primarily airs sci-fi and action series and films, as well as selected programs from the BBC (such as its nature documentary series).

Unlike the BBC's domestic channels in the United Kingdom, BBC America does not receive funding from the British license fee (which is the principal funding for the BBC's channels within the United Kingdom), as the BBC cannot fund any of its channels that are available outside the United Kingdom. Consequently, BBC America operates as a commercial-supported channel and accepts traditional advertising. It is also funded by television subscription fees.

As of November 2023, BBC America is available to approximately 60,000,000 pay television households in the United States-down from its 2017 peak of 82,000,000 households. In 2024, AMC Networks purchased BBC Studios' remaining stake in the channel. AMC Networks continues to license the BBC name and branding from BBC Studios as well as some of the content that airs on the channel.

== History ==
=== Background ===
The idea for BBC America was first mooted in December 1994, as part of a two-channel plan by BBC Worldwide to enter the US cable market by means of a partnership with Cox. The two channels were going to be BBC World, which was due to launch the following year, and an entertainment channel, named BBC Prime or BBC America. There were no short-term plans to launch the channel, which, according to the teams, was in its "research stages". Preparations for the channel began in March 1997, with a launch set for "as early as summer 1998".

=== Launch and early years ===
BBC America was announced in December 1997 under a commercial agreement with Discovery Communications and launched on March 29, 1998, presenting a mixture of comedy, drama and lifestyle programs from BBC Television and other British television broadcasters including ITV and Channel 4. In the channel's early days, it focused on repeats of popular lifestyle shows such as Changing Rooms and Ground Force. BBC America's head of television programming later stated that the channel needed to establish a niche, since non-British viewers found the lifestyle shows appealing. Most of the newer programs appeared as part of BBC America's evening schedule.

The network removed the British soap opera EastEnders from its schedule in 2003 due to low ratings; however, the program's removal from BBC America provoked complaints from viewers, which caught media attention.

After CEO Paul Lee was appointed president of ABC Family in 2009, the network appointed Bill Hilary from Comedy Central to serve as its chief executive officer. Hilary appointed Kathryn Mitchell to the new position of general manager. Under Hilary's tenure, BBC America was restructured; it moved its main offices to New York City and had its programming budget increase substantially. The channel was led by Garth Ancier, who served as the president of BBC Worldwide Americas from February 2007 until 2010, when he was succeeded by former MTV Networks executive Herb Scannell. Meanwhile, Perry Simon serves as general manager.

=== AMC Networks joint venture (2014–2024) ===
In 2014, AMC Networks acquired a 49.9% equity stake in BBC America for $200 million, and replaced Discovery Communications as its managing partner. As part of the deal, AMC Networks also took on the responsibility of negotiating American broadcast and advertising sales for the regional variant BBC News (International). AMC Networks CEO Josh Sapan stated that the deal gave his company "a powerful collection of networks that are among the most critically acclaimed, with distinct dramas and other potent content that creates a deep connection with viewers", while BBC Worldwide CEO Tim Davie considered it "an opportunity to grow the creative quality and ambition from an already high base."

AMC Networks became a founding partner in the American launch of BritBox, a streaming service operated by BBC Studios and ITV plc.

On Sunday, April 25, 2021, BBC America unveiled a redesigned logo and tagline – "Brit-ish".

=== Fully owned subsidiary of AMC Networks (2024–present) ===
In AMC Networks' Q3 earnings report released November 8, 2024, the company announced that it had closed a deal with the BBC on the first of that month to buy it out of its 50.1% stake in BBC America for $42 million in cash, clarifying that the transaction would be the final time AMC was increasing a non-controlling interest by paying in cash. The report further stated, "Assuming the transaction had closed on September 30, 2024, $132.9 million of redeemable noncontrolling interest related to BBC America, and reflected on the condensed consolidated balance sheet, would have been eliminated. Additionally, the Company’s future contractual programming commitments to BBC Studios would have been significantly reduced." The BBC continues to maintain commercial ties with the channel, with AMC paying licensing fees to BBC Studios for the use of the BBC name and branding and some of the channel's programming.

== Programming ==
Some of the programs on the channel are edited either for adult content or to allow for commercials. Occasionally, comedy shows are run in specially formatted 40-minute blocks and a few first-run drama programs are broadcast in a longer block that allows them to run to their original broadcast length. Additional series that has been previously broadcast may periodically return to the schedule as part of the network's rotation of daytime programming.

=== Original programming and co-productions ===
In the mid-2000s, BBC America produced a few of its own original shows, along with some joint productions; including Sharpe's Challenge, part of the Sharpe series of made-for-television movies and co-produced with ITV; and The State Within and Jekyll, which were co-productions with the BBC. The first original series produced solely by the channel was Copper, which premiered in the summer of 2012.

BBC America has also branched into co-producing British series, including Robin Hood, The Musketeers, Killing Eve, Mood and from its fourth series, the revival of Doctor Who (until 2022). They also co-produced the Canadian series Orphan Black with Bell Media's Space channel.

=== Newscasts ===
BBC America used to broadcast BBC World News each Monday through Friday morning from 6:00 to 8:00 am Eastern and Pacific Time. All news programs now air exclusively on the BBC News Channel, also distributed by AMC Networks in the United States.

The weekday morning (6:00–9:00 am Eastern) simulcast used to include BBC World News bulletins, World Business Report, Sport Today, Asia Today, and a one-hour bulletin called World News Today. Most of these were removed from the schedule without any announcement on April 6, 2009. The weekend morning (6:00–6:30 am ET) simulcast was also abruptly dropped on April 4, 2009. According to BBC America, the simulcast was dropped because of disappointing ratings.

From 2007 to 2011, BBC America broadcast BBC World News America, a live Washington, D.C.–based program anchored by Matt Frei. Katty Kay served as a Washington-based correspondent. On February 18, 2011, network management announced that BBC World News America would be dropped from BBC America and would instead be broadcasting only on the BBC World News channel and PBS member stations in the United States.

The network was in discussions to unveil a weekly news program fronted by Newsnight host Jeremy Paxman, who was to introduce a synopsis of Newsnight items with an international aspect and was expected to bring his interviewing style to bear on American politicians. An international edition of Newsnight debuted on February 29, 2008, in the 10 pm time slot. This program was cancelled in November 2008, but the announcement of the program's cancellation was not made until April 2009.

During major breaking news events, the network sometimes replaces scheduled programs with coverage from BBC News; the London bombings in July 2005 was one example. BBC News's American coverage started out sparse, but has expanded within the last decade on several providers throughout the United States, generally alongside BBC America as part of AMC Networks' retransmission consent negotiations (one previous example is New York City-based Cablevision, which did not carry BBC America until August 2011) or BBC World News America, an American-focused news program presented by Katty Kay and usually from Washington, D.C., mainly carried by American public television stations through a distribution agreement with Washington PBS member station WETA-TV.

=== Sports ===
BBC America has carried coverage of the PDC World Darts Championship in simulcast with Sky Sports, with preliminary rounds streaming, and the finals airing on television.

== Identity ==
At launch, BBC America carried the BBC One balloon, with a limited set of idents. This was replaced in 2001 by a new look designed by TZ Design, a predominantly white look with the Union Jack appearing. In April 2004, BBC Broadcast unveiled a new look for the channel, winning the bid against two US design firms. The new identity was "coherent" in order to cater all media, while maintaining the white and black scheme and the colors of the Union Jack, core elements of the previous look, in the rebrand.

On January 17, 2007, a new look by design firm mOcean was unveiled, featuring a secondary blue, white and red bullseye logo with a lowercase A, as well as the tagline A little Brit different. The new look had consultancy from BigSmall and was designed by BigStar.

The current identity brought forth the secondary logo unveiled in 2021 a chance to become primary. The "Brit-ish" tagline is a subtle reference to British humor.

== Outside the U.S. ==
BBC America is available in Caribbean countries, such as:

- Bermuda on One Communications's cable service, and the World on Wireless service,
- The Bahamas on REVTV,
- Barbados on Flow,
- Cayman Islands on Logic TV,
- Grenada on Flow,
- Telbo MiTV in Bonaire,
- Curaçao on Flow
- SXM Cable & Data in Sint Maarten

It is also available in the Pacific in the US territory of Guam on DoCoMo Pacific and GTA Teleguam's IPTV service; as well as in the Northern Marianas on DoCoMo Pacific.
