= Cher Coulter =

British celebrity stylist and fashion designer

Cher Coulter (born August 12, 1976) is a British celebrity stylist and fashion designer. She is known for her list of celebrity clientele, including Sienna Miller, Kate Bosworth, Elizabeth Olsen, and Rosie Huntington-Whiteley.

== Early life ==
Since the age of 15, Coulter has worked in the London fashion industry in all venues, from helping organize ID magazine photoshoots, coloring sketches for Vivienne Westwood, to dressing models at shows at the age of 17, including Hermès. She received a Foundation Diploma in Art and Design in 1992 from St. Albans College of Art and Design in London and a Fashion Design at Diploma Level from London’s Southend College of Art and Design in 1993. Afterwards, she attended Central St. Martins from 1993 to 1996, honing her creativity in the company of designers like Alexander McQueen, Stella McCartney, and Phoebe Philo. She graduated with her bachelor's degree in Fashion Design in 1996.

== Early career ==
Coulter co-founded the UK Menswear brand, AKA, with fashion designer Anne Marie Ng, acknowledged for its "highly desirable collection of relaxed tailoring" which sold at Colette in Paris, Barneys, Bergdorf's in New York City and distributed from Paris to Japan. Together they designed and produced stage outfits for the female band All Saints as well as T-shirts for Hugh Grant in the movie About a Boy and commissions for Game Boy. Some celebrity fans of the brand included Kate Moss, Liam Gallagher, and David Beckham. From 1996 to 2003, she also designed women’s wear under a private label for Urban Outfitters and consulted with their buyers on a monthly basis.

== Design accomplishments ==
Apart from AKA, Coulter, designed a line of clothes for Richard Ashcroft, and tour T-shirts for the band, Starsailor. Other design accomplishments include T-shirts for Keira Knightley, and T-shirts based on About a Boy for the House of Fraser, clothes for Virgin Music, and a limited edition tracksuit for Pro-Keds.

== Current projects ==
Coulter is currently a stylist in Los Angeles and New York, working alongside the likes of Karl Lagerfeld, Francisco Costa, and Alexander Wang. She styled Sienna Miller for her GI Joe World Tour, Robin Wright for Cannes, Orlando Bloom, Jason Statham, Rosie Huntington-Whiteley, Eric Bana, Elizabeth Olsen, Nicole Richie, and has been Kate Bosworth’s stylist since 2006. Coulter also finds time to do fashion editorial work for fashion magazines, such as Nylon, Vogue, Elle, Bergdorf Goodman, and Marie Claire and ad campaigns for the likes of Diesel, Shiseido, L'Oreal, and BCBG. Her most recent project is a jewelry line designed with friend and actress Kate Bosworth, called JewelMint.

== JewelMint ==
JewelMint, the first vertical of MySpace co-founder Josh Berman and Diego Berdakin’s social commerce company BeachMint, is a jewelry site with designs exclusively by Coulter and Bosworth. The two paired with the company to create a line of affordable fashion jewelry. The premise of the site is that members receive a new piece of jewelry each month from the personalized choices recommended to them by their JewelMint Style Quiz results. JewelMint has been featured in the Los Angeles Times, InStyle, Teen Vogue, C, People StyleWatch, InTouch Weekly, and OK! magazine.
