= SpryNet =

Former Internet service provider

SpryNet was formed as a dial-up Internet service provider by CompuServe on February 6, 1996.

Assets and customers were acquired by MindSpring in October 1998.
