= Reed Slatkin =

American Ponzi operator (1949–2015)

- Born: Reed Eliot Slatkin; January 22, 1949; Detroit, Michigan, US
- Died: June 23, 2015 (aged 66); Los Angeles, California, US
- Occupation: Former investment manager
- Motive: Ponzi scheme
- Convictions: Guilty plea, 15 counts: mail fraud, wire fraud, money laundering, obstruction of justice
- Penalty: 14 years in U.S. federal prison; was released after 10 years

Reed Eliot Slatkin (January 22, 1949 – June 23, 2015) perpetrated one of the largest Ponzi schemes in the history of the United States. Presented to others as an "investment club", his unregistered investment operation eventually involved $600 million and included 800 victims. Slatkin pleaded guilty and spent 10 years in prison. The majority of investors were Scientologists, and the Church of Scientology agreed to pay back $3.5 million to the bankruptcy estate.

== Ponzi scheme ==
Over a 15 year period, Slatkin operated an unlicensed "investment club". Slatkin was not a registered broker‑dealer with the United States Securities and Exchange Commission (SEC), and his investment club was not a member of the Securities Investor Protection Corporation (SIPC). His earlier financial success investing in the startup Earthlink gave him credibility and enabled him to convince others to invest with him, while his connections within Scientology (Note: Slatkin had been an ordained Scientology minister since 1975. In 2003, a Church spokesperson said Slatkin "used his position in the church to suck in Scientologists who were victimized along with other people.") gave him access to wealthy investors.

From 1986 to 2001, Slatkin raised approximately $593 million from about 800 investors, the majority of whom were Scientologists. Using the funds from later investors, he paid one group of early investors $279M on their original $128M investment, citing investment success without actually making most of the investments he claimed he made. He also paid out millions to associates as "consultants". During this time, he made unwise investments, commingled funds, paid personal expenses, and presented fictitious returns to his investors showing rates of return from 24% to as high as 100%.

The SEC started investigating Slatkin's operation in 1999, but it wasn't until 2001 when the whole scheme unraveled. In early 2001, an investor requested the return of his money, and in April filed suit and writs of attachment to freeze assets. The next month, Slatkin filed for chapter 11 bankruptcy. Immediately afterward, the SEC filed an enforcement action and obtained a temporary restraining order freezing his remaining assets. On the same day, the Federal Bureau of Investigation executed search warrants on his homes, offices, and some locations of his associates.

The SEC brought the civil case in SEC v. Slatkin, Civil Action No. 01-04823 (C.D. Cal.). The Central District of California brought the criminal case in U.S. v. Reed E. Slatkin, CR 02-313 (C.D. Cal.).

Slatkin pleaded guilty to mail fraud, wire fraud, money laundering, and obstruction of justice. On September 2, 2003, he was sentenced to 14 years in federal prison. Slatkin served 10 years of his sentence, and in 2013 he was released from a halfway house in Long Beach, California. In 2015 it was reported that Slatkin had died from a heart attack.

== Bankruptcy clawback ==
The bankruptcy estate sought to recover funds paid to early investors who had profited from the scheme, in order to redistribute assets to net-losing victims. The trustee evaluated a list of 75 people who had significantly profited from the scheme, deciding to seek recovery of over $12 million from a dozen individuals who came out ahead on the scam. It settled with several who profited from the scheme, including Scientologists Greta Van Susteren and her husband John Coale who agreed to pay back $700,000 of their 'profits'.

In a settlement with the bankruptcy estate, the Church of Scientology agreed to pay back $3.5 million. Many of the investors were Scientologists, who funneled millions of dollars to the Church and its related entities including Narconon, Celebrity Centre, and Church of Scientology Western United States.

Celebrity Scientologists who were members of Slatkin's "investment club" include actors Joe Pantoliano, Anne Archer, Giovanni Ribisi, producers Art Linson and Armyan Bernstein, film composer Mark Isham, and Earthlink founder Sky Dayton.

== Aftermath ==
In addition to Slatkin's conviction, his bookkeeper pleaded guilty to "obstructing an SEC investigation by creating fake documents" and "failing to alert authorities to Slatkin's crimes".

Slatkin's son, who is a musician and promoter, changed his name legally by dropping the last name "Slatkin".

In February 2008, the television show American Greed featured the Slatkin case, titled "Stealing $$$ from Scientologists".
