= Jay Weston =

American film producer (1929–2023)

- Born: John Martin Weinstein; March 9, 1929; New York City, U.S.
- Died: February 28, 2023 (aged 93); Los Angeles, California, U.S.
- Education: New York University
- Occupations: Film producer; restaurant critic; newspaper columnist
- Years active: 1960s–2023
- Spouse: Ann Weston Begelman (m. 1970–1978)
- Relatives: Stanley Weston (brother)

Jay Weston (born John Martin Weinstein, March 9, 1929 – February 28, 2023) was an American film producer and restaurant critic. He is known for producing Billy Wilder's final comedy, Buddy Buddy, and the Academy Award-nominated Lady Sings the Blues, as well as for his popular restaurant newsletter that focused on the Los Angeles dining scene. He was a regular contributor to the Huffington Post.

== Early life ==
Weston grew up in a Jewish family in Brooklyn, New York. His father worked in the garment industry, while his mother was a homemaker and a jazz pianist. His brother, Stanley, would grow up to create the G.I. Joe action figure. Weston graduated from New York University in 1949. While serving in the army during the Korean War, he was editor of a military newspaper, The Hialean, that received numerous prestigious recognitions, including three Army Commendation Medals.

== Career ==
=== Early years ===
Before working in film, Weston worked as a newspaper columnist and as a public relations executive. His first entertainment job was as a Broadway press agent.

When he returned to New York from the war in 1953, he started his career in public relations, in which he founded one of the largest PR firms in the country at that time. He also played a prominent role in Cinerama Inc., the company that created the Cinerama widescreen film process. Weston worked at Cinerama for a decade.

=== Film and theater ===
His years at Cinerama gave Weston a deeper love and appreciation for film, which led him to write The War Horses, a screenplay that was subsequently purchased by film producer Joseph E. Levine. The War Horses was a story about how the Boer War of Africa was won by the British by remounting their cavalry on American cow ponies. It was to star Richard Burton, Elizabeth Taylor, and John Wayne. Although the script was never produced, Weston's passion for film continued and he went on to create his own independent production company.

Weston became head of ABC's feature film division, Palomar Pictures, in 1967, where his first project became They Shoot Horses, Don't They? The film went on to be nominated for eight Academy Awards and win one. Weston then co-produced For Love of Ivy, the first major studio production to star two black actors (Sidney Poitier and Abbey Lincoln).

In 1968, Weston returned to New York to produce the Broadway play Does a Tiger Wear a Necktie?, which launched the career of a then-unknown Al Pacino. The actor went on to win a Tony Award for his performance, even though the play ran for only 39 performances.

Probably his most well-known and acclaimed film, Lady Sings the Blues, came in 1972. Starring Diana Ross in her acting debut, the film was a biographical film about jazz singer Billie Holiday and went on to be nominated for five Academy Awards. Weston had originally offered the role to Abbey Lincoln, but she declined.

Weston sued Creative Artists Agency (CAA) in 1979 about the rights to a film and, years later, it was revealed that Weston was "totally ostracized" by the agency.

=== Restaurant critic ===
Weston's love of food led him to found Jay Weston's Restaurant Newsletter, which was available by subscription through the mail beginning in the early 1980s. Weston counted many notable Hollywood names as subscribers. His opinion on restaurants was sought by numerous reputable publications, including The New York Times.

== Death ==
Weston died of natural causes at the Motion Picture & Television Fund home in Woodland Hills, Los Angeles, on February 28, 2023, at age 93.

== Filmography ==
=== Film ===
Year	Production
1968	For Love of Ivy
1972	Lady Sings the Blues
1976	W.C. Fields and Me
1980	Night of the Juggler
1981	Underground Aces
1981	Chu Chu and the Philly Flash
1981	Buddy Buddy
1990	Side Out

=== Television ===
Year	Production	Notes
1987	Laguna Heat	Television film
1999	Invisible Child	Television film
