= Diffbot =

American machine learning and knowledge management company

- Type: Private company
- Industry: Internet
- Founder: Mike Tung
- Headquarters: Menlo Park, California, U.S.
- Area served: Worldwide
- Key people: Mike Tung (CEO)
- Services: Web APIs, Enterprise Search, Web Scraping, Web Crawling
- Website: www.diffbot.com

Diffbot is a developer of machine learning and computer vision algorithms and public APIs for extracting data from web pages / web scraping to create a knowledge base.

== Overview ==
The company has gained interest from its application of computer vision technology to web pages, wherein it visually parses a web page for important elements and returns them in a structured format.

In 2015 Diffbot announced it was working on its version of an automated "knowledge graph" by crawling the web and using its automatic web page extraction to build a large database of structured web data.

In 2019 Diffbot released their Knowledge Graph which has since grown to include over two billion entities (corporations, people, articles, products, discussions, and more), and ten trillion "facts."

== Features ==
The company's products allow software developers to analyze web home pages and article pages, and extract the "important information" while ignoring elements deemed not core to the primary content.

In August 2012 the company released its Page Classifier API, which automatically categorizes web pages into specific "page types". As part of this, Diffbot analyzed 750,000 web pages shared on the social media service Twitter and revealed that photos, followed by articles and videos, are the predominant web media shared on the social network.

In September 2020 the company released a Natural Language Processing API for automatically building Knowledge Graphs from text. The company raised $2 million in funding in May 2012 from investors including Andy Bechtolsheim and Sky Dayton.

Diffbot's customers include Adobe, AOL, Cisco, DuckDuckGo, eBay, Instapaper, Microsoft, Onswipe and Springpad.

== See also ==
- GPT-3
- Common Crawl
- AlphaEvolve
