= DAG Ventures =

American venture capital firm

- Type: Private
- Industry: Private equity
- Founded: 2004; 22 years ago
- Founders: Tom Goodrich; John Cadeddu
- Headquarters: Palo Alto, California, USA
- Products: Investments; Venture capital; Growth capital
- Website: www.dagventures.com

DAG Ventures is an American venture capital firm based in Palo Alto, California. DAG Ventures works with startups in providing early stage and growth stage funding. Since its founding in 2004, by Tom Goodrich and John Cadeddu, the firm has backed nearly 180 ventures, including Ambarella Inc., Armo Biosciences, Eventbrite, Fireeye, Glassdoor, Grubhub, Nextdoor, Wealthfront, Wix.com, Yelp, and Zettle.

== Funds ==
DAG Ventures was created out of Duff Ackerman & Goodrich, a private investment firm formed in 1991.

In June 2011, DAG Ventures announced their fifth fund.

In 2019, founding members of DAG Ventures launched a new venture fund, the Corner Ventures DAG Fund.

== Investments ==
DAG Ventures has invested in almost 250 startups, since its inception in 2004. Notable ones are including,

- AdMob (acquired by Google)
- Altor Networks (acquired by Juniper Networks)
- Ambarella Inc. (IPO in Oct 2012)
- Avvo
- Bloom Energy (IPO in July 2018)
- Boku (IPO in Nov 2017)
- Brighter (acquired by Cigna)
- Chegg (IPO in Nov 2013)
- Cloudera
- Convertro (acquired by AOL)
- Displaylink (acquired by Synaptics)
- Eventbrite (IPO in Sep 2018)
- FireEye (IPO in Sep 2013)
- Fortify Software (acquired by HP)
- Funny or Die
- Glassdoor
- Grubhub (IPO in Apr 2014)
- Mint.com (acquired by Intuit)
- New Relic (IPO in Dec 2014)
- Nextdoor (IPO in Nov 2021)
- Oakley Networks (acquired by Raytheon)
- OpenDNS (acquired by Cisco)
- RingCentral (IPO in Sep 2013)
- SeekingAlpha
- SunRun (IPO in 2015)
- Upwork (IPO in October 2018)
- TrustArc
- Wework
- Xoom (acquired by PayPal)
- Yelp (IPO in Mar 2012)
- Zimbra (acquired by Yahoo)
- Zuora (IPO in Apr 2018)
- Zynga (IPO in Dec 2011)
