= CloudKitchens =

Ghost kitchen and virtual restaurant company

- Industry: Food industry
- Founded: 2016
- Founders: Diego Berdakin; Sky Dayton
- Area served: United States
- Key people: Travis Kalanick (CEO)
- Services: Software, Real Estate, Virtual restaurant
- Parent: Atoms, Inc.
- Website: cloudkitchens.com

CloudKitchens is a Los Angeles-based company that operates ghost kitchens and develops related technology. The company was founded in 2016 and was later acquired by Uber's cofounder Travis Kalanick. The company provides commercial kitchen spaces restaurants focused on food delivery, including production kitchens, CPG, meal prep, food prep, catering, and others, repurposing underutilized real estate and providing software to manage online orders.

== History ==
CloudKitchens was established in 2016 by entrepreneurs Diego Berdakin and Sky Dayton, with its first facility in Los Angeles, California. In 2018, Travis Kalanick, cofounder of Uber, acquired a controlling stake in CloudKitchens' parent company, City Storage Systems, for approximately $150 million and became CEO. John Curran, a former executive at Amazon, was appointed Chief Financial Officer (CFO) in 2021.

The company secured significant funding, including $400 million from Saudi Arabia's Public Investment Fund in 2019 and $850 million in 2021 in a round that included Microsoft. By 2019, the company was valued at approximately $5 billion, growing to an estimated $15 billion by 2021.

CloudKitchens expanded to multiple countries, acquiring London-based FoodStars in 2019, followed by acquisitions in Latin America including Mexico-based Nano and Colombian company Cocinas Ocultas. The increase in food delivery during the COVID-19 pandemic also contributed to the company's growth.

By 2022, CloudKitchens had acquired around 40 properties in 24 cities, with expenditures exceeding $130 million, and employed over 4,000 individuals worldwide. In different regions, it operates under local brand names, such as Kitchen Central in Brazil.

CloudKitchens maintained limited public communications for several years. In 2024, Kalanick broke that trend and publicly presented a concept referred to as the Internet Food Court, aiming for delivery times under 15 minutes through automation. This system targets dense urban areas and workplace districts. By this time, CloudKitchens reported operating hundreds of kitchen units in different countries.

In 2022, Kitchen United raised $100 million in an attempt to compete with CloudKitchens. Kitchen United eventually exited the competition, selling its real estate assets in late 2023. Another competitor, salad chain Mixt, sued CloudKitchens in 2024 for re-selling their products.

In 2023, CloudKitchens closed several sites and laid off workers to reduce costs.

The IPO for the company's Middle East unit was planned in mid 2025, but subsequently delayed in December 2025.

== Operations ==
=== Ghost kitchen facilities ===
CloudKitchens constructs private kitchen spaces for rent in shared facilities equipped with necessary cooking equipment and utilities. Restaurants can lease these kitchens to operate delivery-focused businesses without the cost of a full storefront. Additional services typically include refrigeration, maintenance, janitorial support, and front-of-house staff for pickup orders.

CloudKitchens builds ghost kitchens and other real estate for established chains such as Sweetgreen, The Halal Guys, Chick-fil-A, Wendy's, and Burger King.

=== Real estate ===
The company's model involves acquiring and converting underused properties into kitchen centers in areas with high delivery demand. This approach allows the company to control layout, make technological upgrades, and benefit from potential property value increases.

Some of CloudKitchens' real estate includes software and robotic automation that reduce operation costs for tenants.

=== Otter software platform ===
Otter is a software suite developed by CloudKitchens to consolidate delivery orders from multiple platforms. The system helps restaurant operators manage incoming orders, streamline workflows, and analyze sales data across platforms. Initially created for internal use, Otter is now available to external restaurants and reportedly handled 18% of food delivery transactions in the U.S. as of 2024.

The company has expanded Otter's capabilities to include point-of-sale terminals, kitchen display units, and ordering kiosks.

=== Other ventures ===
- Picnic: An on-site meal service for workplaces using smart food lockers where employees can order from multiple restaurants in a single transaction.
- Lab 37: A robotics division focusing on automated infrastructure for restaurants, including the "Bowl Builder" that can serve up to 200 meals per hour without human intervention.
- Future Foods: Creates and licenses virtual restaurant brands to operators both inside and outside CloudKitchens facilities. These virtual brands often resort to provocative names like "Excuse My French Toast" and "Send Noods." Future Foods handles marketing including food photography. Other novelty brands include Egg the F* Out, B*tch Don't Grill My Cheese, Charcootz, LA Breakfast Club, Brooklyn Calzones, Devil's Soul Food, and Phuket I'm Vegan.
- ProFoods: Helps enterprises and restaurant brands find and develop optimal new locations.
- Launch.co: An incubator program in collaboration with Jason Calacanis to support new entrepreneurs in the food delivery industry.

== Lobbying ==
CloudKitchens has been linked to lobbying activities in the United States through the Digital Restaurant Association (DRA), an organization established in 2022 with support from Tusk Holdings, a consulting and investment firm led by Bradley Tusk, an early investor in Uber and associate of Kalanick. The DRA advocates for regulatory changes affecting the food delivery industry, including legislation that would require third-party delivery platforms such as DoorDash, Uber Eats, and Grubhub to share customer data with restaurants. The organization has also supported proposals to cap the commissions charged by these platforms to restaurant members. Supporters argue that these measures could improve transparency and help restaurants better engage with customers. Critics, however, have raised concerns about consumer privacy and the implications of data sharing with smaller businesses that may lack advanced data protection infrastructure.
