= FamilyFun =

US magazine

- Editor-in-chief: Elizabeth Anne Shaw
- Categories: Family
- Frequency: Eight times a year
- Total circulation: 2,130,223 (June 2013)
- Founder: Jake Winebaum
- Founded: 1991
- Company: Dotdash Meredith
- Country: United States
- Based in: New York City
- Language: English
- ISSN: 1056-6333

FamilyFun was a family magazine published 8 times annually by Dotdash Meredith (formerly Meredith Corporation).

== History and profile ==
Launched in 1991 by Jake Winebaum, FamilyFun is written for parents with children aged 3 to 12, and focuses on family cooking, vacations, parties, holidays, crafts, and learning. The magazine was purchased by Disney Publishing Worldwide in 1992 and Meredith acquired FamilyFun from Disney in 2012. Disney Interactive relaunched its FamilyFun.go.com site as Spoonful.com in 2012. FamilyFun is part of the Parents.com network.

Although its parent company Meredith is based in Des Moines, Iowa with offices in New York City, the headquarters of the magazine was in Northampton, Massachusetts, until late May 2015 when it moved to Manhattan. In August 2015 Elizabeth Anne Shaw became the editor-in-chief of FamilyFun.
