= Get Rich Click! =

2011 book by Marc Ostrofsky

Get Rich Click! The Ultimate Guide to Making Money on the Internet
- Hardcover edition
- Author: Marc Ostrofsky
- Language: English
- Subject: Business, Personal finance, Internet, Self-help
- Genre: Non-fiction
- Publisher: Razor Media Group
- Publication date: May 2, 2011
- Publication place: United States
- Media type: Print
- Pages: 272 pp
- ISBN: 978-0-9827696-0-7

Get Rich Click!: The Ultimate Guide to Making Money on the Internet (2011) is a New York Times best-selling business book written by Marc Ostrofsky, an American writer, business owner, and serial entrepreneur. The book was published on May 2, 2011 by Razor Media Group.

== Synopsis ==
In Get Rich Click!, Ostrofsky attempts distill a variety of internet based business models into different internet industries. The book includes chapters on different internet industries, such as e-commerce, search, advertising, affiliate marketing, domain names, and social media.

The book also contains case studies from successful internet entrepreneurs in many of the aforementioned internet industries. In an effort to bridge the virtual and physical world, the majority of these case studies contain QR codes which take a reader to a video interview with the people featured in the case studies.

Furthermore, each chapter contains Ostrofsky’s own views on how to profit in various internet industries.

== Awards/Recognition ==
- New York Times Bestseller
- Wall Street Journal Bestseller
- USAToday Bestseller
- Shortly after the book was released, Get Rich Click! was featured on The View because of high sales volume.

== Testimonials ==
The book contains endorsements by Steve Wozniak, Jack Canfield, Stephen Covey, David Bach, and Brian Tracy.
