= Brighter =

- Industry: Technology; Health care
- Founded: 2010
- Founder: Jake Winebaum
- Headquarters: Santa Monica, California
- Parent: Cigna
- Website: www.brighter.com

Brighter is a Santa Monica-based internet and healthcare company that connects dentists, patients, and dental insurers. The company licenses a consumer-driven dental benefits experience to insurance carriers to help them administer dental plans more efficiently and offer patient-friendly services such as online and mobile provider directories, patient reviews, and a proprietary online appointment scheduling feature, Brighter Schedule. The company's founder and CEO is internet entrepreneur Jake Winebaum.

Brighter's technology powers member engagement tools used by major dental insurers including Cigna, Aetna, and Delta Dental.

In December 2017, Brighter was acquired by Cigna.

== Early products ==
The company's first product was a dental savings plan geared toward uninsured patients. It was profiled in several national publications, including Good Morning America, ABC World News with Diane Sawyer, The Los Angeles Times, Bloomberg BusinessWeek, Reuters, and TechCrunch.

In 2014, the company launched Brighter PRO, a dental benefit plan for self-funding companies. Companies use self-insured preferred-provider (PPO) dental plans, with access to an online platform to search for local providers, compare, and select a dentist.

== Licensing ==
As of 2017, three of the largest dental insurers in the United States utilize Brighter products, through the company's licensing agreements with Cigna, Delta Dental, and Aetna.

In 2015, Cigna began licensing Brighter's platform to power the myCigna website and mobile app. The licensing agreement includes profiles of in-network providers, estimated copays, and online appointment scheduling.

Delta Dental added Brighter's appointment scheduling software, Brighter Schedule, to its mobile application in March 2017. Online scheduling was extended to DeltaDental.com in July 2017.

In August 2017, Aetna announced that it would be launching an updated experience on its Aetna Navigator site in January 2018. The new experience will include all of its dental customers and feature Brighter's entire suite of member engagement tools.

== Funding and acquisition ==
Brighter secured about $49 million in investments, with backing from General Catalyst, Mayfield Fund, Benchmark, DAG Ventures, and Tenaya Capital.

In December 2017, Cigna announced that it had acquired Brighter. In the announcement, Cigna said it planned to create new digital products for its members and for health care providers and to integrate Brighter's technology into existing products and services.
