= Cidco MailStation =

Portable e-mail terminal

The Cidco MailStation was a portable e-mail terminal first introduced by Cidco, Inc. in 1999 at Amazon.com and was marketed as the Mivo 100 by EarthLink. MailStation is no longer sold by either EarthLink or Amazon.

The MailStation was designed to send and receive e-mails via a standard POTS telephone line. It was intended as an alternative to a laptop computer in regards to its messaging capabilities and also as an alternative to a personal computer for those who for whatever reason do not have access to one but who wish to enjoy the benefits of e-mail.

The device could hold up to four hundred messages and up to one thousand contacts. Most e-mail attachments could not be viewed with the device, though later models were able to open small images.

== Mailstation models ==
Since the introduction of Mailstation in 1999 it has been released in five different models:

- Mivo 100
- Mivo 150
- Mivo 200
- Mivo 250
- Mivo 350

All the models are portable and run on either 3 or 4 AA batteries or with an AC adapter. It has a parallel printer port for printer connection. Though the previous models (Mivo 100, Mivo 150, Mivo 200) didn't have the capability of receiving attachments, that drawback was later rectified with the Mivo 250 and Mivo 350. Mivo 250 and 350 had the capability of receiving attachments, such as GIF and JPEG images, but the size of the mail along with the attachment was limited to 100 kB. In addition to receiving attachments, the Mivo 250 and Mivo 350 included a separate wireless modem allowing untethered mobility for short distances. All the models have a full-size keyboard and extra features, such as a calendar and a calculator.

== Functionality ==
Mailstation is an e-mail device which can work both by using a power adapter or using batteries. The email can be drafted while offline, and when connected can be sent using a button on the device called get mail/mail. As on PCs, when the button is pressed, the device sends queued emails and receives new emails from the server. Users have a Web-based account, (similar to Yahoo!) which can be accessed through any Internet-connected PC. Emails are downloaded from the Web site to the Mailstation for offline viewing. The Mailstation connects to the server for a few seconds to send and receive messages, and disconnects after that.

== Extra features ==
Mailstation can also be used to receive content related to weather, lottery, finance news, astrology and television program listings. The updates are sent to the users when they are available from the service provider.

== Earthlink support dwindling ==
For a period of time after production of Mailstation hardware ceased and Earthlink discontinued the sale of the devices, the company still allowed new customers to sign up for the Mailstation service. At some point prior to early 2011, Earthlink stopped accepting new Mailstation accounts, and will not transfer an existing Mailstation account to a new device. This implies that while Earthlink continues to provide the service for existing Mailstation customers, the number of Mailstation accounts Earthlink services can only decrease as customers voluntarily cancel their accounts and/or the physical Mailstation devices still being serviced fail.

== See also ==
- Amstrad E-mailer
