= Buddy Buddy =

1981 American comedy film

- Theatrical release poster by John Solie
- Directed by: Billy Wilder
- Screenplay by: Billy Wilder; I. A. L. Diamond
- Based on: L'emmerdeur (1973) and the play Le contrat by Francis Veber
- Produced by: Jay Weston
- Starring: Jack Lemmon; Walter Matthau; Paula Prentiss; Klaus Kinski
- Cinematography: Harry Stradling Jr.
- Edited by: Argyle Nelson
- Music by: Lalo Schifrin
- Production company: Metro-Goldwyn-Mayer
- Distributed by: United Artists (United States/Canada); Cinema International Corporation (International)
- Release date: December 11, 1981
- Running time: 96 minutes
- Country: United States
- Language: English
- Budget: $10 million
- Box office: $7,258,543 (US/Canada)

Buddy Buddy is a 1981 American comedy film based on Francis Veber's play Le contrat and Édouard Molinaro's film L'emmerdeur. It is the final film directed and written by Billy Wilder.

== Plot ==
To earn his long-awaited retirement, hitman Trabucco eliminates several witnesses against the mob. On his way to his last assignment, Rudy "Disco" Gambola, who is about to testify before a jury at the court of Riverside, California, he encounters Victor Clooney, an emotionally disturbed television censor who is trying to reconcile with his estranged wife Celia.

Trabucco takes a room in the Ramona Hotel in Riverside, across the street from the courthouse where Gambola is to arrive soon. As chance would have it, Victor moves into the neighboring room at the same hotel, and after he calls Celia and she rejects his attempts at a reconciliation, he tries to kill himself. His clumsy first attempt alerts Trabucco, and fearing the unwelcome attention of the police guarding the courthouse, he decides to accompany Victor to quietly eliminate him, but he is repeatedly foiled by a series of inconvenient happenstances.

Trabucco and Victor drive to the nearby Institute for Sexual Fulfillment, the clinic where Celia, a researcher for 60 Minutes, has enlisted because she has become enthralled with the clinic's director, Dr. Hugo Zuckerbrot. After Celia spurns Victor again, they return to the hotel, where Victor plans to jump off the building after setting himself on fire. While trying to stop him, Trabucco accidentally knocks himself out and Victor, having a change of heart, brings him back inside and tries to take care of him. Meanwhile, Zuckerbrot and Celia devise a plan to have Victor confined in a mental institution; Zuckerbrot arrives at the hotel and after mistaking the injured Trabucco for Victor, injects him with a potent sedative.

With Gambola's arrival imminent, Trabucco attempts to fulfill his contract but is too groggy to make the shot. After seeing him assembling his rifle and learning Trabucco's true profession, Victor volunteers to take out Gambola to help his new "best friend". Victor succeeds, and the two escape the police after Trabucco, posing as a priest, has made sure that Gambola is dead, but he refuses Victor's company and heads off alone.

Months later, Trabucco enjoys his tropical island's retreat until he is unexpectedly joined by Victor. Victor explains that he is wanted by the police after blowing up Zuckerbrot's clinic, and Celia has run off with the doctor's female receptionist. Desperate to get rid of the irritating Victor, Trabucco suggests to his native servant the possibility of reviving the old custom of sacrificing humans in the local volcano.

== Cast ==
- Jack Lemmon as Victor Clooney
- Walter Matthau as Trabucco
- Paula Prentiss as Celia Clooney
- Klaus Kinski as Dr. Hugo Zuckerbrot
- Dana Elcar as Captain Hubris
- Miles Chapin as Eddie, the Bellhop
- Michael Ensign as Hotel Manager
- Joan Shawlee as Receptionist
- Ben Lessy as Barney Pritzig
- Fil Formicola as Rudy "Disco" Gambola
- C.J. Hunt as Kowalski
- Bette Raya as Mexican Maid
- Ronnie Sperling as Hippie Husband
- Suzie Galler as Pregnant Wife
- John Schubeck as Newscaster
- Ed Begley Jr. as Lieutenant #1
- Frank Farmer as Lieutenant #2
- Tom Kindle as Highway Patrolman #1
- Biff Manard as Highway Patrolman #2
- Myrna Dell as Cashier

== Production ==
=== Development ===
L'emmerdeur, a huge hit in Europe, had been released as A Pain in the Ass in art houses in the United States, where it had enjoyed moderate box-office success. Jay Weston of William Morris Agency obtained the remake rights and pitched on the film for Matthau, Lemmon and Wilder to work.

Wilder said of the film, "If I met all my old pictures in a crowd, personified, there are some that would make me happy and proud, and I would embrace them ... but Buddy Buddy I'd try to ignore."

"I couldn't say no to Billy," Matthau said later, "and I didn't want to say no to being in a Billy Wilder picture. But this wasn't a Billy Wilder picture."

"Iz Diamond and I were working on another project," said Wilder, "when William Morris came to us with this one. We looked at the French movie and saw possibilities in it. I would prefer doing an original story or screenplay. The most fun is working on a movie like Sunset Boulevard or The Apartment, where you start from scratch. Here I found myself with a ready-made thing, but there are certain advantages to that. I didn't have to audition for the studios and pass through Checkpoint Charlie before they would approve the project. We knew we had a starting date, which is rare enough these days."

Wilder said, "I hadn't been working enough, and I was anxious to get back on the horse and do what I do – write, direct. This wasn't a picture I would have chosen."

Wilder and Diamond wrote the script in three months—"a record for us" said Wilder—but then they "sat on it" waiting for the Actors Guild strike to end, and for Lemmon and Matthau to become available. The film roughly followed the original, although the ending was changed.

"I aim a movie at pleasing me and maybe ten of my friends," said Wilder, adding:

That's the only way I know how to operate. The audience senses when you're doing something without any conviction ... To keep your sanity and your self-respect, you must believe that there will be an audience for what you want to do. It may not be the blockbuster of all time, but what is wrong with a modest success? Once you lose the belief that quality will pay off, you are lost. The next thing you know, you're doing a 'Tuesday the 11th' horror story. I could do that if I wanted to. After all, there are still about 360 days left in the calendar.

"It's the funniest script since Some Like It Hot," said Lemmon. "It has no message - it's just fun."

Wilder said that the film would be "a bit like Some Like It Hot ... and hopefully it'll be fast and funny. But unlike Kiss Me, Stupid, this is a commercial movie - nothing arty in it, nothing very serious, somewhere in between Stir Crazy and George Bernard Shaw."

Matthau said, "In farce, the object of the film is to be very funny - not just funny, but very funny. So it's easy. You either are funny, or you're not. The audience has to suspend disbelief totally, and presumably they get some pleasure in return."

The film was budgeted at $10 million, which Wilder said was "less than the average advertising campaign". He gave a key role to Klaus Kinski, calling him "an extraordinary actor ... a funny Nosferatau. There hasn't been a face like his since Conrad Veidt."

Buddy Buddy was produced by Metro-Goldwyn-Mayer; Wilder had not made a film at the studio since writing the screenplay for Ninotchka with Charles Brackett and Walter Reisch in 1939. Wilder said:

They've been renting out so much of their studio space to outside people that now they have to find studio space outside for their own pictures. But there seems to be a drive toward it becoming a full studio again. I just regret how the whole thing dissolved by selling off the props and art when Jim Aubrey was hired to supervise the graves here. In the mid-Thirties, studios had a personality. You could recognize an MGM movie from a Paramount movie from a Warner's movie. That's gone ... Every time you saw white living rooms, white beds, white décor, you knew it was an MGM movie. It's like the hotels now. It doesn't matter whether you're in Paris or Istanbul, you're in the same place. Pride is gone, confusion is rampant. People who are in power today and make the decisions couldn't be my second assistant. On the plus side, there is a push to come back. It's not all mercenary. There is enough confidence from Begelman and Frank Rosenfelt to leave us alone and not breathe down our backs.

Wilder first met Veber for lunch at the MGM commissary when the latter was in Hollywood working on the screenplay for Partners (1982). Wilder gave him a copy of the script, and Veber said, "I thought then that I saw flaws in it and wanted to tell him about them but I didn't dare. I have too much respect for that man. And who was I, a little Frenchman, to say anything? So I just said 'Very good' and left it at that."

=== Shooting ===
Principal photography for Buddy Buddy began at MGM in Culver City on February 4, 1981. From the beginning, Wilder had problems with the script. "Wilder the writer let Wilder the director down," he stated. "We had to write too fast. The script was done in three months. We always took much longer, but the wheels were rolling, and we had to go forward." Two weeks into filming, the director realized, "It didn't work to have two comics together. I needed someone serious like Clint Eastwood as the hit man instead of a comedian like Matthau."

Veber agreed, saying that Wilder "made the same mistake I made when I wrote the story as a play in Paris. It was not a great success because I did not make the killer tough enough. I changed that when I wrote the film. Lino Ventura played the part as a really hard killer. Billy Wilder cast Matthau in the part and that was a mistake. You cannot be frightened by him. He would have been better off with someone like Charles Bronson."

Lemmon said later that he told reporter that making the film was "a dream ... Not only do Walter and I know what each of us is going to do. We also had the advantage of three days of rehearsal, something Billy hasn't done before. This movie is like The Odd Couple, with much of it scenes between Walter and me."

Lemmon also said that he sensed a change in the director's approach to filmmaking. "Billy seemed more tense. He seemed to be pushing harder, forcing it ... It was something I couldn't put my finger on exactly. He had always been open to suggestions I had for my part ... but this time, I didn't feel as welcome with my ideas, so I didn't say anything. Who am I to tell Billy Wilder what he should do?"

Matthau was injured on a laundry chute while filming. Wilder said, "If you are an experienced director today, you are old-fashioned. If you don't know where to put the camera, you are a revolutionary nouvelle vague cinematic genius. The only things that seem to do well today are garbage. You pile up cars in a wreck. However, as those pictures are keeping the companies alive and permitting them to subsidize our pictures, I suppose I shouldn't complain. But I complain."

Wilder added during filming, "This is my 53rd year in the industry and in that time I've seen a lot of ebb and flow - lately there's been an inordinate amount of ebb. But to paraphrase a line of Simon Wiesenthal's, 'A movie maker who does not believe in miracles is not a realist.' All I know is it's nice to be working." The film was a critical and commercial failure, and in later years Klaus Kinski even denied being in it. "The best thing for me about Buddy Buddy was that not very many people saw it," Wilder said: "It hurts to strike out on your last picture."

Eager to bounce back from the unhappy experience, he and Diamond immediately went to work writing what they hoped would be their next project. "Iz and I had so many ideas, we'd work on one for four weeks, and then we'd start another. We'd been burned; we chose wrong with Buddy Buddy, and we didn't want to make another mistake. We'd had some failures, so our confidence wasn't as good." Although Wilder and Diamond had developed several ideas for another film, none of them came to fruition, leaving Buddy Buddy as their last collaboration and Wilder's final directorial effort.

== Reception ==
=== Critical reception ===
Reviews of Buddy Buddy were mixed-to-negative, with only a few mainstream critics liking the film, one of them being Vincent Canby of The New York Times. Calling it "slight but irresistible", Canby observed that it "doesn't compare with the greatest Wilder-Diamond films, including The Fortune Cookie, which launched Mr. Lemmon and Mr. Matthau as a team, but it is the lightest, breeziest comedy any one of them has been associated with in years." He added, "There's something most appealing about the simplicity of the physical production and the small cast. I suspect that one of the reasons Buddy Buddy is so congenial, even when a gag doesn't build to the anticipated boff, is because you never feel intimidated by it. It doesn't attempt to overwhelm you with the kind of gigantic sets, props and crowd scenes that made farces on the order of 1941 and The Blues Brothers so oppressive. Buddy Buddy travels light, unencumbered by expensive special effects, fueled only by the talents of its actors and its director's irrepressible sense of the ridiculous." He said of Lemmon, "Not in a long time has [he] been more appealing", and he described Matthau as "extremely comic – perhaps our best farceur".

Far less enthusiastic was Roger Ebert of the Chicago Sun-Times, who stated, "This movie is appalling. It made me want to rub my eyes. Was it possible that the great Billy Wilder ... could possibly have made a film this bad? Buddy Buddy is very bad. It is a comedy without any laughs. (And, yes, I mean literally that it contains no laughs.) But it is worse than that. It succeeds in reducing two of the most charming actors in American motion picture history to unlikable ciphers. Can you imagine a film that co-stars Walter Matthau and Jack Lemmon and yet contains no charm, ebullience, wit, charisma – even friendliness? This whole movie is like one of those pathetic Hollywood monsters drained of its life fluids ... Basically, we are invited to watch two drudges meander through a witless, pointless exercise in farce ... Buddy Buddy is incompetent. And that is the saddest word I can think of to describe it."

Gene Siskel of the Chicago Tribune named it as the worst film of 1981 (Roger Ebert disliked the film as much as Siskel did, but his pick for 1981's worst film was Heaven's Gate).

Channel 4 said, "Wilder helming the classic comic pairing of Matthau and Lemmon is always going to be difficult to dismiss, but it has to be said that all involved had seen better days at the time this got made ... There's the recognizable chemistry between the two leads, but little else here to recommend. It would be foolish to come to this movie expecting The Odd Couple or The Apartment, but you do expect something a little better than this."

Wilder later reflected, "In this Donner Pass expedition known as Hollywood, many fall by the wayside. People eat people. Very few make it. Lately I've been going to more funerals than openings of pictures. Sometimes you have a funeral and an opening on the same day, and you don't feel very good when you see a comedy after you've put somebody to rest or watched the Neptune Society blow his ashes into the Pacific Ocean ... Sometimes I feel the way you feel when you find yourself at a dinner party with an uncongenial group of people and you say, 'I've got a great story, but I'm not going to tell it to them tonight. I'm not interested in entertaining them.' A lot of energy goes into it, and sometimes it doesn't seem as if it's worth the trouble. I've been doing it now for over 50 years."

On the review aggregator website Rotten Tomatoes, 63% of 16 critics' reviews are positive.

=== Box office ===
The film opened in 700 theaters, the same weekend as Rollover. It finished second with a gross of $2,132,221, and eventually grossed $7.3 million in North America.

== See also ==
- Buddy film – a related genre
