= Chu Chu and the Philly Flash =

1981 film by David Lowell Rich

- Theatrical release poster
- Directed by: David Lowell Rich
- Screenplay by: Barbara Dana
- Story by: Henry Barrow
- Produced by: Jay Weston
- Starring: Alan Arkin; Carol Burnett; Jack Warden; Ruth Buzzi; Adam Arkin; Danny Aiello
- Cinematography: Victor J. Kemper
- Edited by: Argyle Nelson
- Music by: Pete Rugolo
- Production company: Melvin Simon Productions
- Distributed by: 20th Century Fox
- Release date: August 28, 1981
- Running time: 92 minutes
- Country: United States
- Language: English
- Budget: $7 million
- Box office: $221,898

Chu Chu and the Philly Flash is a 1981 American comedy film starring Alan Arkin, Carol Burnett, Jack Warden, Ruth Buzzi, Adam Arkin and Danny Aiello. It was directed by David Lowell Rich and produced by Jay Weston, with the screenplay being written by Arkin's wife, Barbara Dana. Arkin plays down-on-his-luck former baseball player Philly Flash and Burnett plays Carmen Miranda-style performer Emily "Chu Chu" Laedecker.

The film was released on August 28, 1981, by 20th Century Fox. It received negative reviews from critics and was a box office bomb. Many of the scenes, particularly the exterior scenes of Chu Chu's home, were filmed in San Francisco's Potrero Hill district.

== Plot ==
Philly Flash used to be a talented baseball player, but now he's a homeless recovering alcoholic who sells broken watches on the streets of San Francisco, California. Elsewhere, Emily Laedecker, better known as Chu Chu, is a one-woman Latin band who wears a Carmen Miranda-inspired outfit who performs on the waterfront to make money, but she is angered when Flash arrives to sell watches in her public performance space. Luck seems to smile at them when they find a briefcase with stolen government documents in it. So they scheme to return it to the thief in exchange for money.

The viewer learns that the thief is being threatened by gangsters who seek the plans, and on whose behalf he seems to have originally stolen them. Philly Flash gets the thief's contact information as he flees the scene.

Chu Chu negotiates a payment of $300 but the attempted exchange in a public park is thwarted by a public fair. The buyers had been told to meet them at a hotdog stand, but many stands appeared for the fair and the two could not find each other. They then fail to sell it to the U.S. government, which does not believe them, and to the Soviet embassy. They seek to combine efforts with "The Commander", leader of the local homeless population, but the original thief and the gangsters arrive. Amidst chaos, Chu Chu and Philly Flash escape with a small amount of money, leaving the plans with the original thief. Philly Flash takes only enough money for a bus trip out of town, planning to leave for a job coaching a youth softball league in Michigan. He changes his mind at the last minute, not wanting to leave her behind. As the bus departs, he learns that she had arrived separately to take the same bus, and gives chase to join her.

== Cast ==
- Alan Arkin as Philly Flash
- Carol Burnett as Emily "Chu Chu" Laedecker
- Jack Warden as The Commander
- Danny Aiello as Johnson
- Adam Arkin as Charlie
- Danny Glover as Morgan
- Sid Haig as Vince
- Vincent Schiavelli as B.J.
- Ruth Buzzi as Consuelo
- Vito Scotti as Vittorio
- Lou Jacobi as Landlord
- Barbara Dana as Betty
- Neile Adams as Car Woman
- Tony Arkin as Puppeteer
- Dabbs Greer as Wally
- John Steadman as Snyder
- Arnold Johnson as Bum
- Max Grodénchik as Frankie
- Matthew Arkin as Passerby
- Ralph Chessé as Hot Dog Man #3

== Productions and background ==
In January 1974, it was announced the film was the third script from Broadway lyricist Bob Merrill, the others being Mahogany and Freaky Friday. It was about Chu Chu, a Puerto Rican prostitute and Philly Flash, a Bowery wino who claims he used to be a baseball pitcher. Merrill wanted to make it for Columbia.

In January 1975, it was announced that the film would be a joint venture between Raquel Welch Productions, Columbia Pictures and Monroe Sachson Productions with Raquel Welch playing the part of Chu Chu. Ron Talsky, who was dating Welch at the time, was set to produce the movie with Merrill writing the screenplay. However, Columbia was nervous about Talsky producing the film and said they were re-evaluating the project. Eventually, Columbia pulled out of the project, as did Welch, Sachson and Merrill, Talsky was the only participant from the original Welch venture to actually be a part of the final film. Talsky did not remain a producer on the movie, but instead was hired as the film's costume designer.

Alan Arkin became involved with the project after a chance meeting with Jay Weston. Arkin agreed to star in the film under the condition that his wife, Barbara Dana, be allowed to rewrite the script. (She had written children's books, folk songs and another script with her husband.) Arkin spent the next seven years developing the film with Weston. Dana had a small role in the film, and Arkin's three children, Adam Arkin, Matthew Arkin and Tony Arkin also had roles in the film. "We wanted to say something positive about people," said Dana. Arkin called it "the best script I've read in years."

In April 1980, it was announced that Arkin would appear in the film alongside Carol Burnett for Melvin Simon Productions. The director was David Lowell Rich who had done a TV movie with Arkin, The Defection of Simas Kudirka.

=== Shooting ===
Principal photography for the film began on August 20, 1980, with location filming in San Francisco and Los Angeles, California. According to production notes, San Francisco locations included Alta Plaza Park, China Basin and Potrero Hill. Interior sets were built at the U.S. Navy hangar on San Francisco's Treasure Island. On October 31, 1980, principal photography was completed.

== Reception ==
In her review for The New York Times, Janet Maslin wrote "considering the caliber of its leading players, Chu Chu and the Philly Flash is an amazingly charmless movie. Alan Arkin and Carol Burnett might be expected to generate some interest by virtue of their mere presence in the film, but they are teamed up for a painfully contrived tale, playing lovable losers who aren't lovable at all. Flash (Mr. Arkin) is a dim-witted derelict graced with childlike innocence, and Emily (Miss Burnett) gets to wear bananas in her ears, so the roles are not without their appealing sides. But the movie itself is almost entirely flat... Miss Burnett's wardrobe, by Bob Mackie, is the funniest thing in the movie".

People was critical of the film, writing "this empty vehicle is going nowhere" and writing about Arkin and Burnett's performance: "together they're meant to be one of those wonderfully wacky cinematic odd couples. They're more like a pair on an uncomfortable blind date... but chemistry is everything in a film like this one, and synergy is one thing these two talented performers don't have. Burnett fares marginally better, instilling a hint of pathos in the down-and-out dancer. Arkin, though he seldom speaks below a shout and expends endless energy, might as well be playing to a lamppost for all the emotion he musters.

In the December 1981 issue of Rolling Stone, Chu Chu and the Philly Flash was listed in the article titled "Big Bucks, Big Losers – Twenty-Four Films That Bombed in 1981". The article stated the film's production budget was $7 million, and its domestic rentals were less than $100,000.
