= Deltacom =

Deltacom, Inc.
- Industry: Telecommunications
- Founded: 1997; 29 years ago
- Defunct: 2010; 16 years ago
- Fate: Acquired by EarthLink
- Headquarters: Huntsville, Alabama
- Key people: Randall E. Curran, CEO; Richard E. Fish Jr., CFO
- Services: Plain old telephone service Internet Service; Frame Relay; Asynchronous Transfer Mode
- Number of employees: 2,000

Deltacom, known as ITC^Deltacom until 2006, was a regional competitive local exchange carrier operating in the southern United States, primarily in Alabama, Florida, Georgia, Louisiana, Mississippi, North Carolina, South Carolina, and Tennessee. Deltacom provided local telephone service and long distance calling, Internet service and wide area network connectivity via Frame Relay, Asynchronous Transfer Mode, or dedicated point-to-point telecommunication circuits. Deltacom also provided directory assistance to its own customers and sold the service to other carriers.

In December 2010, the company was acquired by EarthLink.

The company was majority owned by Welsh, Carson, Anderson & Stowe.

== History ==
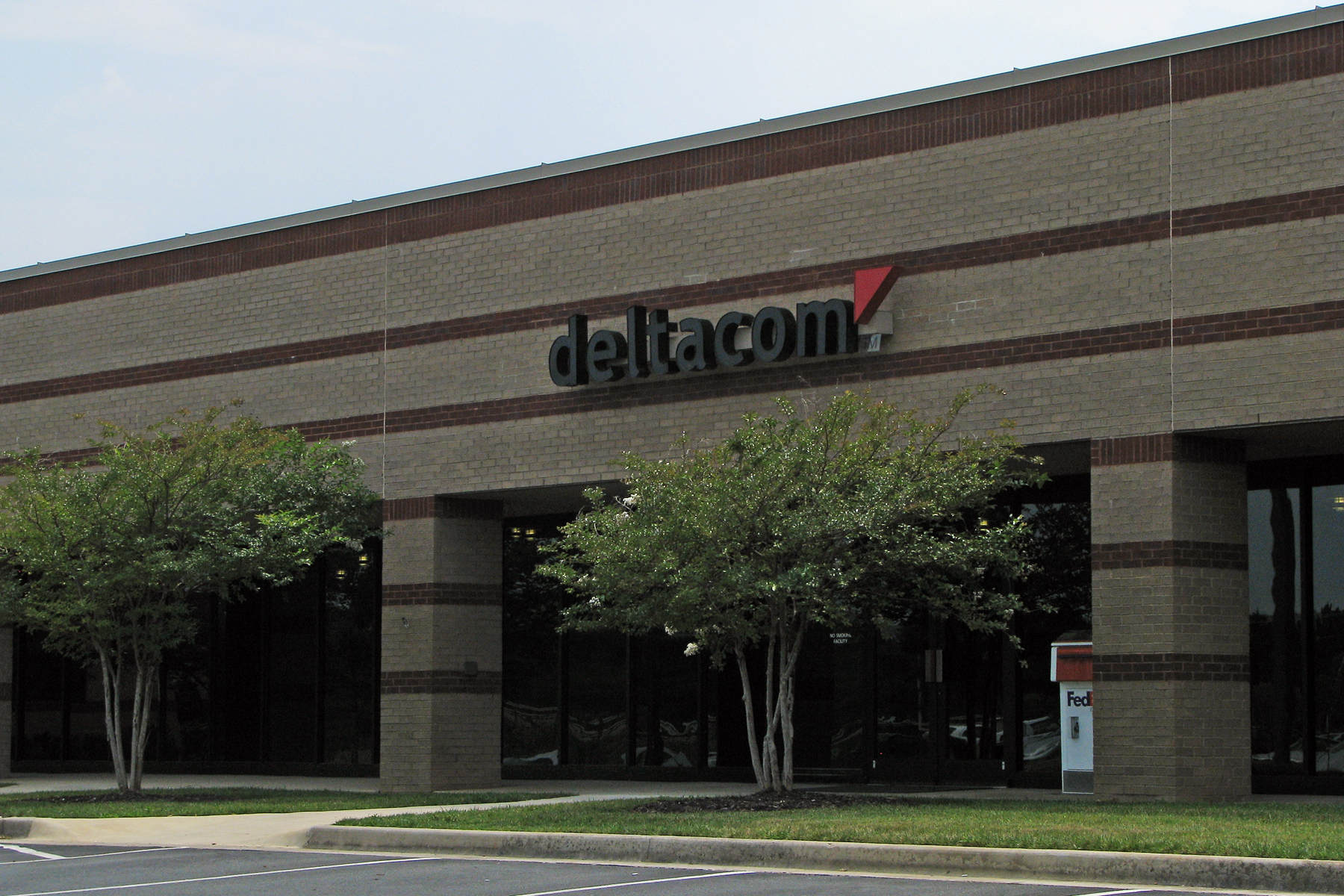
Front entrance of the Deltacom corporate home office in Huntsville, AL

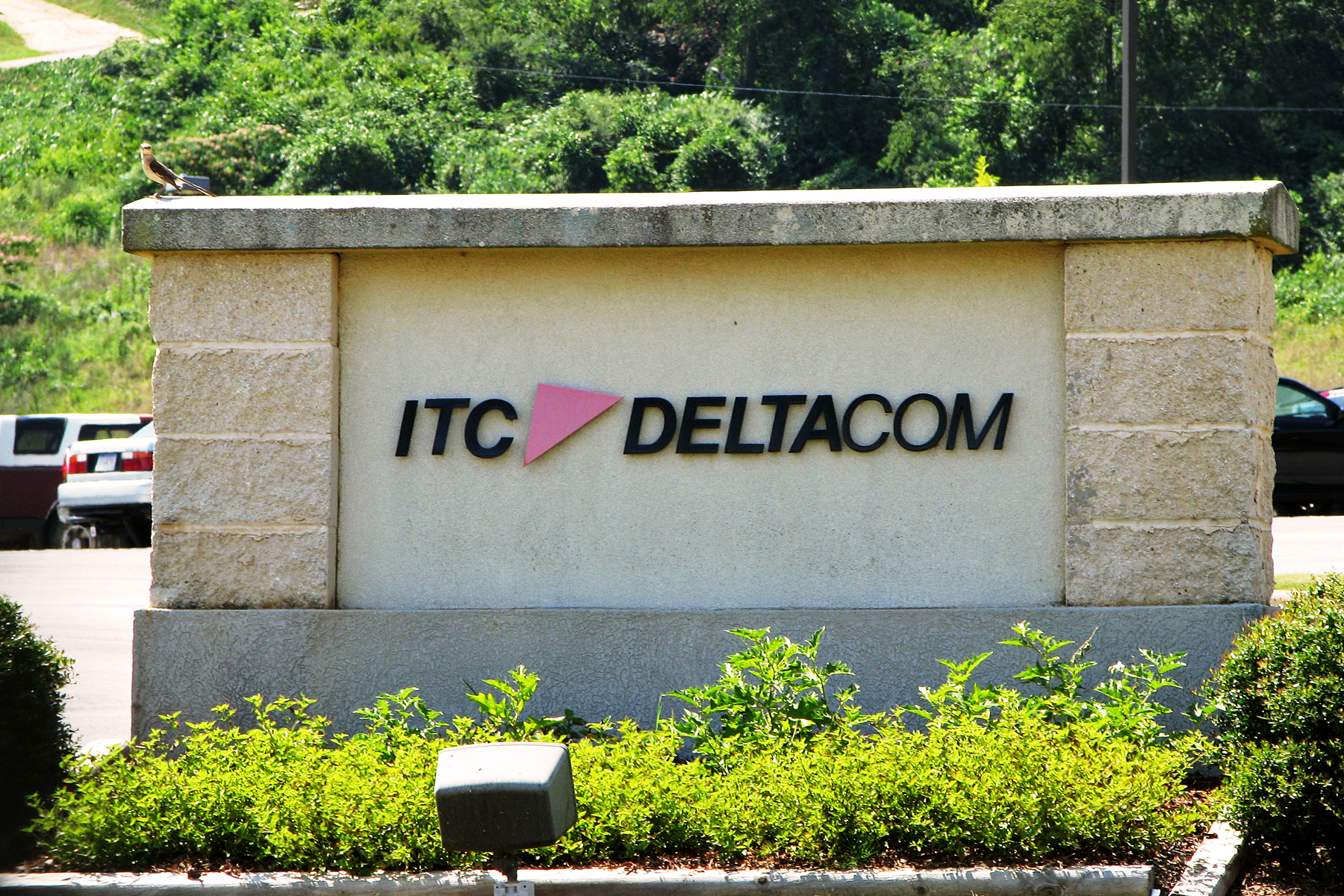
Entrance sign at the Deltacom operations center in Anniston, Alabama

The company was funded by ITC Holding Company.

In October 1997, the company became a public company via an initial public offering.

In 1999, the company acquired Scientific Telecommunications. The company also acquired AvData Systems for $28 million.

In March 2001, ITC Holding made an additional $150 million investment in the company.

In July 2001, Larry F. Williams was named chairman and chief executive officer of the company.

In June 2002, the company filed for bankruptcy protection. It emerged from bankruptcy protection in October 2002.

In 2003, the company merged with Business Telecom.

In 2006, the company changed its name from ITC Deltacom to Deltacom, after ITC Holding Company no longer owned a controlling interest.

In December 2010, the company was acquired by EarthLink.
