= Marc Ostrofsky =

American computer businessman

- Born: October 28, 1961 (age 64)
- Occupations: Author, Entrepreneur, Investor
- Writing career
- Genre: Nonfiction
- Notable work: Get Rich Click

Marc Ostrofsky is an American entrepreneur, venture capitalist, New York Times Best Selling Author and public speaker. He is the author of the books Get Rich Click!: The Ultimate Guide to Making Money Online, and Word of Mouse: 101+ trends using technology on How we Buy, Sell, Live, Learn, Work and Play!. Get Rich Click was in the top ten of the lists of bestselling books compiled by USA Today, The Wall Street Journal and The New York Times.

== Career ==
His career began developing companies for voice mail and voice processing, private pay phones, operator services, telecom reseller and VOIP, and prepaid telephone cards in the United States.

Before writing his first book, Ostrofsky was a domain name investor. His venture capital firm has created a number of telecommunication, publishing and internet based companies, and he is the co-founder of hundreds of web properties. He was a co-founder of Internet REIT (iREIT) (also known as www.iREIT.com), which acquires, develops and sells internet traffic wholesale to Google for them to resell to others on a pay per click basis with partners Ross Perot and Howard Schultz, the founder of Starbucks.

In 1999 he sold the DNS domain Business.com $7.5 million to eCompanies, which was listed in the Guinness Book of World Records for what was, at the time, the most expensive domain name ever sold in the world, Ostrofsky owned a stake in Business.com which was sold in 2008 for $345 million. He coined the phrase "Domain names and web sites are the real estate of the Internet" when he bought Business.com for $150,000 in the mid 1990s, which had been the most money ever paid for a domain name at that time.

Ostrofsky founded five high tech Internet and telecommunications magazines and a dozen technology trade shows, which were later sold to Advanstar Publishing for $8,000,000. He later created and sold Multimedia Publishing Corporation (another firm holding magazines, trade shows and web sites) to Primedia for $35,000,000.

Ostrofsky was the first outside investor in Blinds.com and a member of its board of directors. In 2014, Blinds.com was sold for over $200 Million+ to Home Depot,

He currently owns the web sites Photographer.com, TechToys.com, APPortunity.com, MARCeting.com, LabGrownDiamonds.com, HeartDisease.com, BeautyProducts.com, Potshops.com and 200+ others.

He also founded www.idNames.com, an international domain name registry service that was sold to Network Solutions, and is now a division of VeriSign.

In 2001 Ostrofsky donated a sculpture to the City of Houston, Texas that now resides at the George Bush Intercontinental Airport in Terminal B, Houston, Texas.

Ostrofsky is a professional public speaker domestically and internationally on business, how to make money and entrepreneurship in the age of the internet. He was a member of the National Speakers Association (NSA) and was the original founder of the Internet Commerce Association (ICA).
