= AmericanStyle =

Cultural tourism magazine

AmericanStyle was a quarterly cultural tourism magazine published by the Rosen Group from 1994 till 2012. There were 82 issues published over the 28-year period.

== History ==
AmericanStyle was founded in 1984 by Wendy Rosen, founder of the Rosen Group. The magazine was operated from the company's office in the historic Mill Centre in Baltimore, Maryland. It was the first cultural tourism magazine in America and provided cultural travel information and feature stories on collecting contemporary fine arts and crafts, its makers, and trends in art collection.

Following the growth recession from 2007 till 2009 in America, the magazine closed after its 2012's Fall Arts Preview edition. The magazine faced difficulty in generating and maintaining advertising revenue from art galleries struggling in the wake of the recession.

== Content and cultural influence ==
The magazine provided its readers with tips and advice on art collection, home decoration, interior design, and display concepts, in addition to features of designer jewelry and fashion, art glass, teapots, art furniture, and functional and sculptural ceramics. It also highlighted and included portfolios of craftspeople and artists from various cities of America.

Each issue of AmericanStyle included information for art and craft makers, collectors, and enthusiasts. These articles were about the cultural and economic importance of handmade objects and the significance of the contributions made by craftspeople and artists to local neighborhoods and urban revitalization efforts.

The quarterly issues of the magazine also provided updates on over 200 gallery exhibitions, art festivals, and museum events in their datebook section. It included exclusives on artists’ lifestyles, homes of art collectors, and local art tours in different cities to promote their touristic potential. A number of cities held local and online competitions for inclusion in the AmericanStyle magazine's annual Top 25 Arts Destinations edition, the results of which were based on readers polling. In 2012, the magazine's quarterly publication had a circulation of about 65,000 copies. The selected destinations recognized and promoted these inclusions in their tourism's promotional marketing material and campaigns.

The articles and features from the magazine were used as citations in journals, such as Sociation Today, books, including Outside the Center/On the Edge by Lisa Austrin, published in 2005 by Bucknell University, and The Guild Sourcebook of Architectural and Interior Art, published in 2007. It has also been referred to in books about local cultures and cities, including the 2010-2011 Arlington/Fairfax Counties Real Estate Guide, Northport, American Advance: Westward from the French and Indian War, and Sustainable Communities: Creating a Durable Local Economy
