= BeachMint =

E-commerce company

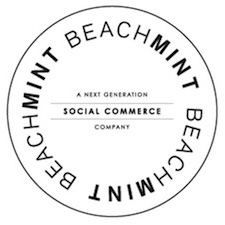
- Type: Private
- Industry: E-commerce
- Founded: October 2010; 16 years ago
- Founders: Josh Berman and Diego Berdakin
- Headquarters: Santa Monica, California, United States
- Products: Jewelry, shoes, apparel, home, intimates, beauty, accessories
- Website: beachmint.com

BeachMint is an e-commerce company with six fashion and lifestyle brands: JewelMint, ShoeMint, StyleMint, IntiMint, HomeMint, and BeautyMint. Each brand features a subscription shopping model with personalized product recommendations for its members from their respective celebrity and expert.

== History ==
The company was founded by Myspace co-founder Josh Berman and serial entrepreneur Diego Berdakin in 2010. BeachMint launched its first brand, JewelMint, with Kate Bosworth and celebrity stylist, Cher Coulter, in October 2010.

Then, BeachMint launched: StyleMint with Mary-Kate Olsen and Ashley Olsen in July 2011, BeautyMint with Jessica Simpson and celebrity skincare expert, Nerida Joy, in October 2011, ShoeMint with Rachel Bilson and celebrity stylist, Nicole Chavez, in collaboration with Steve Madden, in November 2011, HomeMint with Justin Timberlake and interior designer Estee Stanley in May 2012, and intiMINT with Brooke Burke-Charvet in June 2012.

== Growth ==
In September 2011, BeachMint was noted for its rapid growth, with an estimated value of $150 Million. By January 2012, the company had raised a total of $75 million with participation from venture capital firms such as Accel Partners, Goldman Sachs, New World Ventures, and Millennium Technology Value Partners.

== Merger ==
In August 2014, media company Condé Nast merged BeachMint with Lucky Magazine, to form The Lucky Group. In 2016, Beachmint closed Lucky Magazine, and left many freelance workers unpaid.
