= Stanley Weston (inventor) =

American inventor (1933–2017)

- Born: Stanley Alan Weinstein; April 1, 1933; New York City, U.S.
- Died: May 1, 2017 (aged 84); Los Angeles, California, U.S.
- Education: New York University
- Occupation: Inventor
- Children: 3
- Relatives: Jay Weston (brother); Jake Winebaum (son-in-law)

Stanley Weston (born Stanley Alan Weinstein; April 1, 1933 – May 1, 2017) was an American inventor and licensing agent who created the G.I. Joe toy line in 1963, as well as the very concept of the action figure. Weston later sold the rights to his invention, which he called "outfitted action figures", to Hasbro for just $100,000.

He later created his own company, Leisure Concepts, which represented and licensed products based on the likeness of Farrah Fawcett, Star Wars, and Nintendo. During the 1980s, Weston oversaw the creation of the ThunderCats animated series (1985–1989), which spawned the successful ThunderCats toyline.

== Biography ==
Weston was born Stanley Alan Weinstein in Brooklyn, New York City, on April 1, 1933. He attended New York University (NYU) before enlisting in the United States Army during the Korean War. He returned to New York City after the war and completed his master's degree at New York University. Shortly after completing his master's degree, Weston joined a relatively new, emerging segment of the retail and entertainment industries, known as licensing and merchandising. He became a licensing agent who oversaw branding negotiations for Soupy Sales and Twiggy during the 1960s.

Weston became interested in a possible military toy line from frequent trips to an Army-Navy surplus store in New York City, as well as the military articles in the Encyclopedia Britannica, according to accounts written by his brother, Jay Weston. Weston also scoured thrift stores for military uniforms and paraphernalia.

Unlike most toy lines, Weston created G.I. Joe without a backstory, specific enemy, or mission.

Stanley Weston was inducted into the inaugural class of the Licensing Industry Hall of Fame for his invention of action figures and G.I. Joe. He beat other well-known figures, including Walt Disney, for induction into the Hall of Fame.

Stanley Weston died in Los Angeles, California, on May 1, 2017, at the age of 84. He is survived by his three children, Cindy Weston Winebaum (married to Jake Winebaum), Steve and Brad; his brother, Jay Weston; and his half-sister, Ann Sowers.
