= One Communications =

- Company type: Private company
- Industry: Telecommunications
- Founded: 2006
- Headquarters: Burlington, Massachusetts, USA
- Key people: Howard Janzen, CEO
- Products: Telecommunications
- Revenue: $800M
- Number of employees: Approx. 2,000
- Website: www.onecommunications.com

One Communications is a Burlington, Massachusetts-based CLEC providing telecommunications services to commercial entities. The company was formally established on July 3, 2006, as the result of a merger between CTC Communications and Choice One Communications along with their acquisition of Conversent Communications.

On December 20, 2010, Earthlink (which has since been acquired by Windstream) announced that it would acquire One Communications for $370 million, which included payment of approximately $285 million of One Comm net debt. According to their press release, the acquisition will provide EarthLink with:

- a strong IP network footprint in the Northeast, Midwest, and Mid Atlantic regions;
- overlapping connection cities with EarthLink Business (formerly Deltacom & New Edge Networks) long-haul routes in major markets including Washington, D.C., Baltimore, Philadelphia and New York City;
- geographical expansion and scale for managed IP services product strategy supported by a talented One Comm employee base; and
- a solid foundation for potential future acquisitions of revenue bases in the region.

On April 1, 2011, Earthlink announced that it had completed the acquisition of One Communications. Following the close of the transaction, EarthLink planned to integrate One Comm into its "EarthLink Business" division.

== CTC Communications ==
CTC Communications was founded in 1981. CTC became the first reseller of Bell Atlantic services after the Bell System divestiture. CTC then took Bell Atlantic to task and court claiming Bell Atlantic had formed a monopoly, the FCC sided on CTC's case clearing the way for the CLEC industry. In December 2001, CTC pioneered a new technology by placing its first VoIP phone call over a public switching system using their own proprietary technology. In August 2002, CTC was delisted from Nasdaq and on October 3, 2002, CTC filed for Chapter 11 bankruptcy. On December 17, 2003, CTC emerged from Chapter 11 and was acquired by Columbia Ventures Corporation. On May 24, 2005, CTC completed its acquisition of Lightship Telecom. In October 2005, CTC completed its acquisition of Connecticut Broadband.

== Choice One Communications ==
Choice One Communications was a Rochester, New York-based CLEC providing Telecommunications services to commercial entities. The company was founded in 1998. The company announced their plan to merge with CTC on February 10, 2006. The merger was completed in July 2006.

In 2005, it became one of the first telephony carriers to introduce the concept of "Dynamic Bandwidth" as an official product. Dynamic Bandwidth works by transmitting voice and data over a T1 connection using ATM as the underlying protocol. The amount of available bandwidth for data "expands" by 64k for each voice line not in use. When a voice line goes off-hook, the bandwidth reserved for that voice line becomes solely available for use with that line until the call ends, when it becomes usable for data again. Using this concept, a T1 that would normally provide 768k of data and 12 voice lines can provide a full 1.536 Mbit/s connection when no voice lines are in use.

== Conversent Communications ==
Conversent Communications was a Marlboro, Massachusetts-based CLEC and was founded in 1999 as New England Voice and Data. The company name was changed to Conversent in 2000. Conversent acquired REON broadband corporation, Fibernet of West Virginia and Northeast Data Vault before the One Communications merger.

CTC and Choice One announced the acquisition of Conversent on March 28, 2006. The acquisition was completed in July 2006.
