= Diego Berdakin =

Los Angeles-based entrepreneur and professor

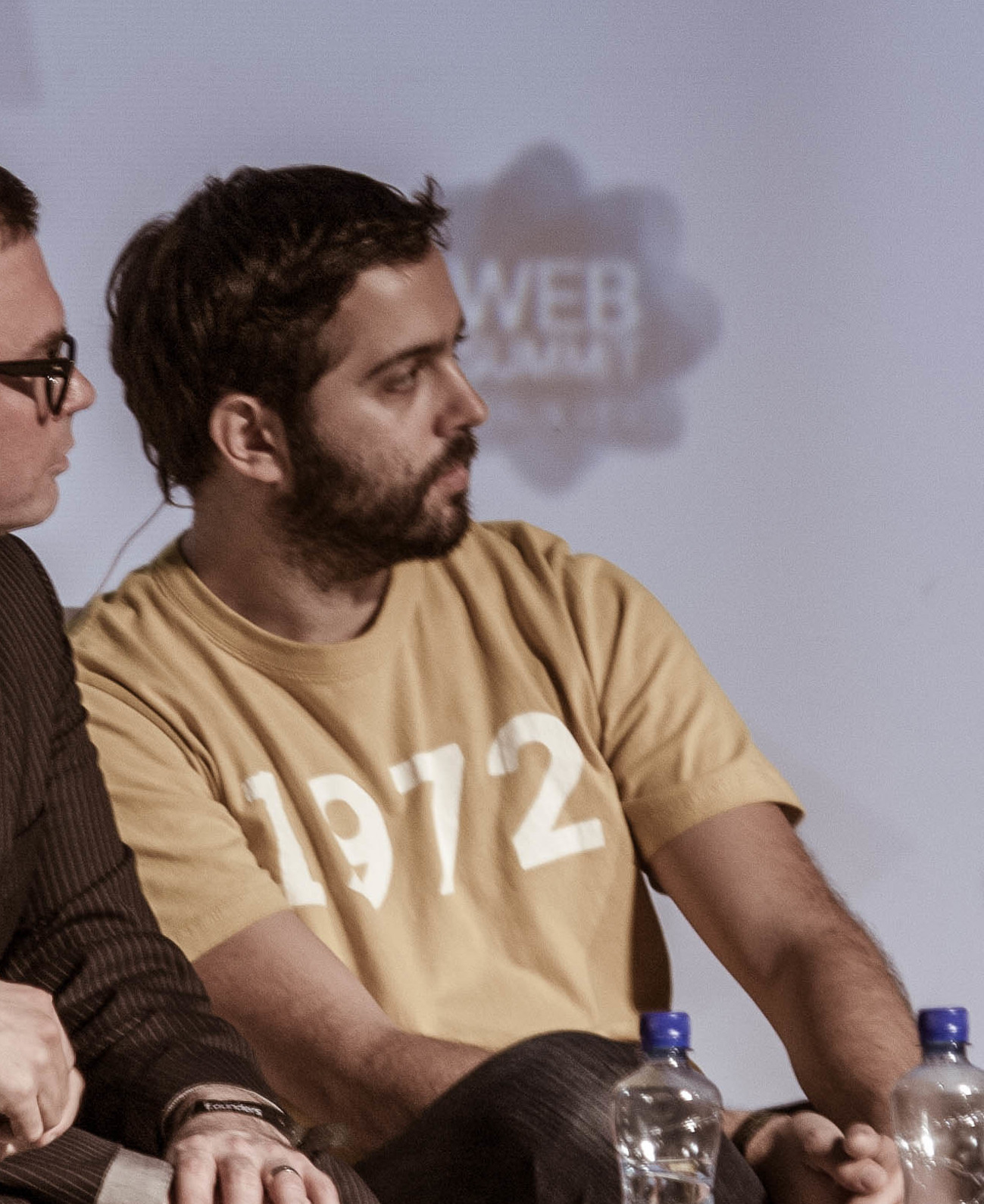
Diego Berdakin at Dublin 2012 Web Summit

Diego Berdakin is a Los Angeles–based Internet entrepreneur and University of Southern California professor. He founded the social commerce company BeachMint along with Myspace co-founder Josh Berman, which later was acquired by Condé Nast to form The Lucky Group. Berdakin is also a notable investor in several technology companies.

== Early life and education ==
Berdakin was born and raised in Los Angeles by his Argentinian parents. He graduated from Northwestern University with a bachelors of science in political science.

== Career ==
Berdakin began his post collegiate career at Slingshot Labs, the digital research and development arm of News Corp., as the executive vice president. In this role, Diego built standalone companies for Myspace, Fox and The Wall Street Journal.

In 2010, Berdakin and Josh Berman teamed up to create the social commerce company BeachMint. Based in Santa Monica, BeachMint attracted the fashion and design talents of celebrities such as Kate Bosworth, Rachel Bilson, the Mary-Kate and Ashley Olsen, Justin Timberlake and jeweler Philip Crangi. In 2014, Conde Nast acquired majority ownership of BeachMint and then merged with Lucky magazine to form The Lucky Group. He was a founding partner at FabFitFun, Re/Done, iEscrow, and Weaving Capital.

Berdakin currently serves as the Chair of Technology, Media & Ethics at the University of Southern California and is involved in the study of Fake News and its impact on popular and public opinion. He has been an adjunct professor at USC School of Cinematic Arts since 2012. In 2015, Berdakin was a finalist for the school’s Steven J. Sample Teaching Award. Berdakin also teaches classes at USC Marshall School of Business and USC Virterbri School of Engineering.

In 2016, Berdakin bought two warehouses and combined them to become the first warehouse kitchen for CloudKitchens (at the time called Urban Kitchen). In January 2019, Travis Kalanick (the former CEO of Uber) purchased a controlling interest in Berdakin's company for US$150 million and subsequently raised $400 million for the company at $5 billion valuation. In January 2021, CloudKitchens raised new funding at a $15 billion valuation.

== Civic engagement ==
Berdakin is the main benefactor of USC School of Cinematic Art's Neighborhood Academic initiative supporting inner city students' creative development. Berdakin serves on the board of directors of The LAPD Foundation which provides critical resources and vital support to the Los Angeles Police Department. Berdakin is a founding member of Mayor's Fund for Los Angeles which is a non-profit organization dedicated to improving life for all Angelenos.

== Investing activity ==
Diego Berdakin has been an investor in several notable internet companies.

- Ring.Com
- GoEuro
- DropBox
- Nest
- FlipKart
- HackerOne
- Postmates
