= Wendell Dayton =

American sculptor (1938–2019)

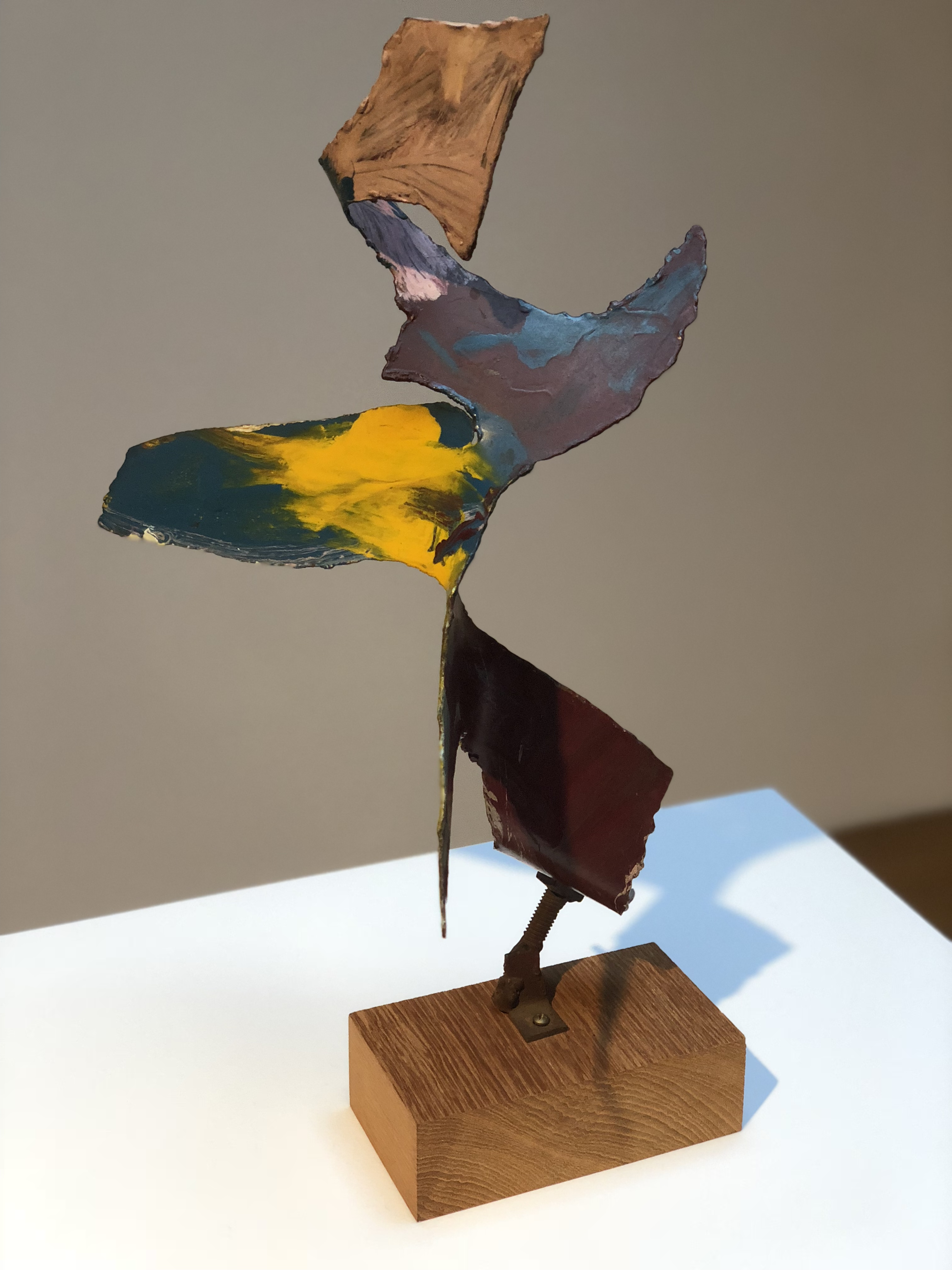
Painted Sculpture by Wendell Dayton, Blum & Poe gallery, 2018

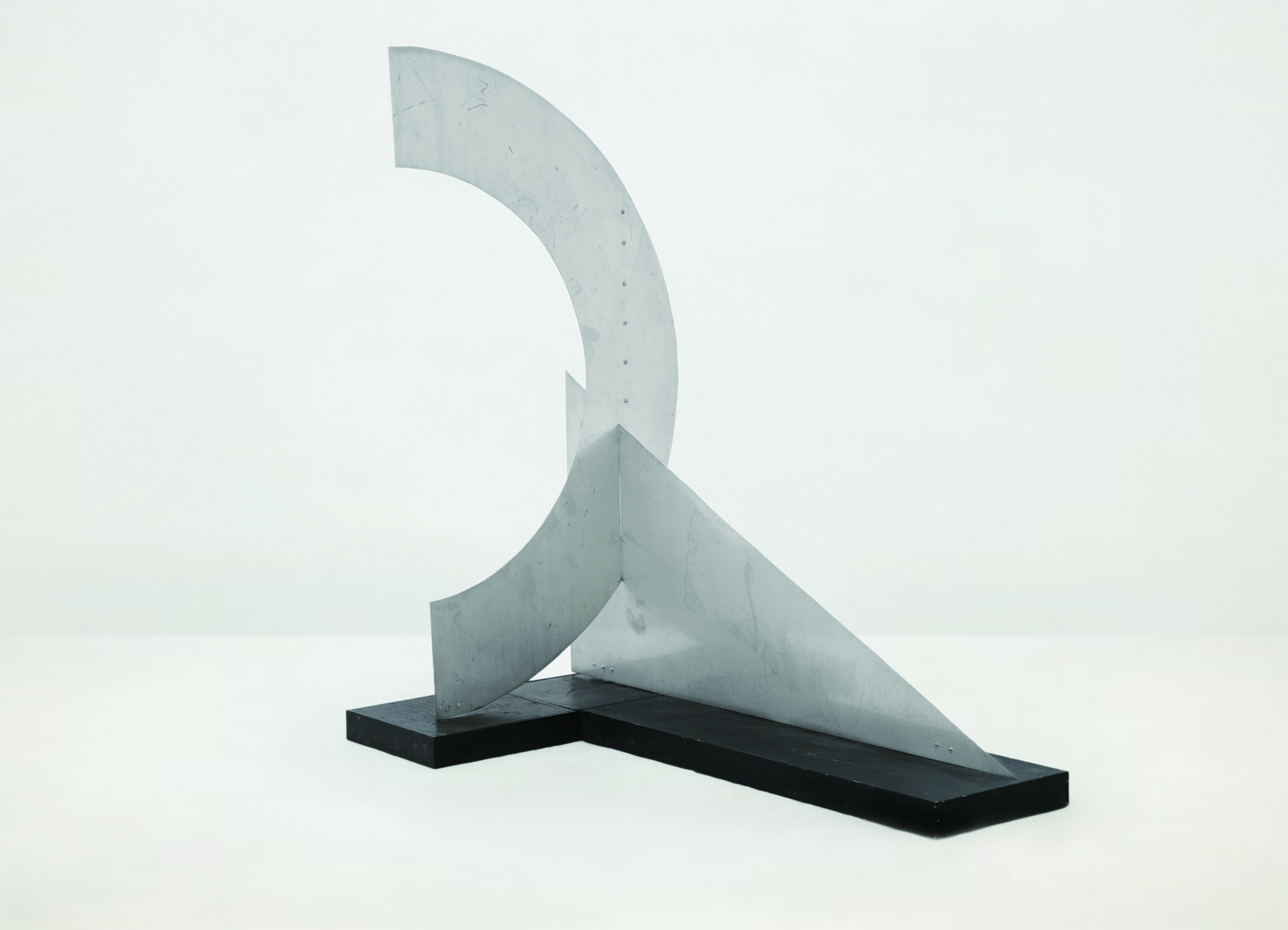
Crescent by Wendell Dayton, 1968, Stainless Steel, Los Angeles County Museum of Art

Wendell Dayton was an American sculptor of both large- and small-scale abstract, mostly steel, compositions. He operated a personal sculpture park in the San Fernando Valley area of Los Angeles, where he also lived and worked. At age 79, Dayton had a piece—a 1968 stainless steel work entitled Crescent—acquired by the Los Angeles County Museum of Art (LACMA) for its permanent collection. At 80, he had a six-decade survey of his work shown at the Blum & Poe gallery in Los Angeles.

== Early life and work ==
Dayton was born in Spokane, Washington, in 1938. He had an early interest in becoming a sign painter but went to Indiana University to study art, earning a B.F.A. in 1960. After graduating, Dayton hitchhiked to New York City, where he lived for 12 years, making a living as a guard at the Whitney Museum and as a maintenance painter at the Museum of Modern Art. Though not directly affiliated with any of the dominant movements in the New York art world at the time—such as Abstract Expressionism and Pop—he met and worked with many of those artists and was friendly with sculptors of the Park Place Group. After initially working as a figurative painter, Dayton transitioned to assemblage and sculpture and began working with salvaged, junkyard materials like steel drums and tin cans.

== Los Angeles ==
Dayton left New York for Los Angeles in 1972, settling in the Silver Lake area of the city. He worked as a carpenter to support his family as he pursued his art, without much commercial success.

In 1999, he moved to a home on a two-acre plot in a rural part of LA's San Fernando Valley, which gave him the space to pursue more large-scale sculptural works. Dayton has continued to exhibit his works, when not picked up by galleries, in the self-made, two-acre sculpture park on his property that's been said to be reminiscent of the ranch of artist Jirayr Zorthian. While he has continued to incorporate a variety of materials in his sculptures, Dayton's later work has focused on large-scale pieces in stainless steel, often salvaged from landfills.

Dayton's late-in-life break came after art collector and former co-founder of Creative Artists Agency (CAA) Michael Ovitz visited his studio. Ovitz recommended his work to Blum & Poe gallery co-founder Tim Blum and LACMA director Michael Govan. Soon after, LACMA acquired Dayton's 1968 stainless steel sculpture, Crescent, for the museum's permanent collection, and Blum & Poe mounted a full-gallery career retrospective of Dayton's work, showcasing 58 pieces spanning 1964–2018.

Dayton died in 2019. He was 81. Blum & Poe said of his work at the time:

"Shapes cut from steel, spliced curling metal pipes, and the parts of a dismembered drill press met in totemic compositions, effortlessly rising from the ground toward the sky. Dayton transmuted these crude mediums into graceful abstracted forms, welded gestures representing the birth of a child, lovers lost, and the celestial bodies above."
