= Pay for performance advertising =

Internet marketing term

Performance advertising (also known as Pay for performance advertising or P4P advertising) is a kind of performance-based advertising where the advertiser pays for the results, such as clicks, leads or purchases. Depending on the agreement made by the advertiser and the publisher/marketing agency, the specific outcome is defined by the terms.

Some prefer to limit the definition and scope of the potential work to be achieved - as in where the agency creates advertising campaigns and promotions to convert the maximum number of new leads or customers and gets paid for its work only when a new lead or a new customer is passed on to the advertiser. But this is not always a viable performance metric when the agency cannot fully control all aspects of the customer acquisition and conversion process.

Advertising with the purpose of generating a lead (which may be defined in a variety of ways), may not always result in a customer because there might be a number of steps after response to an ad and between first contact and final sale.

P4P advertising became popular with the advent of the internet that allows real time measurement of a marketing campaign's ROI (return on investment). It has reversed the traditional value proposition of advertising whereby an advertiser is required to pay for the creative work of the advertising agency and the media first regardless of the return on investment of the campaign. In the P4P model, the onus is on the agency to create a performing ad campaign that converts into good leads or customers if the agency wants to receive payments from its client. In contrast with traditional advertising agency pricing models, the advertiser pays the agency only after having collected leads or the revenues from its customers' purchase orders and not before.

Additional factors may further complicate the pay for performance advertising model. As mentioned above, a caveat to P4P advertising is the degree to which an agency can be held responsible for outcomes while controlling the variables involved. A client's online presence may or may not be appropriate to have ad traffic driven to it. There can be situations where a website or social media venue of a client is lacking in design effectiveness or content credibility, etc. These are not direct ad creation issues, but align more with brand trust and expertise, landing page conversion effectiveness, and more.

In cases where the supporting elements of an advertising effort may adversely affect the outcome of the advertising, the agency may require additional work be done as a preliminary project in getting the website to the point where it can more effectively convert advertising-driven traffic.

Different agencies may handle this situation in different ways due to the severity of the situation and to the degree improvements are needed. This issue can also spill over and into sales response and follow-up. Some agencies may even require training of sales staff to more effectively align conversations with the advertising to create more cohesive and relevant sales messaging.

In addition, ad retargeting may or may not be included as part of the pay for performance model. Some agencies may include retargeting as part of the overall work that produces the results they get paid for. Other agencies may prefer to produce a phase 1 winning campaign, get paid, then work phase 2 to improve results further. It is common for advertisers to test for improving results after establishing a "control" or initially acceptable level of results.

Pay for Performance need not to be confused with pay per click (PPC), which is a pricing model on the Web in which the advertiser pays when an Internet user clicks on its advertisement and visits its site. In some cases P4P could be risk-free to an advertiser whereas in a PPC campaign the advertiser takes the risk of the conversion rate between a click, a visit and an actual lead or sale.

== See also ==
- Pay for performance (human resources)
- Affiliate marketing
- Cost per action
