= Kitchen United =

Ghost kitchen company of the United States

- Type: Private
- Industry: Restaurants, ghost kitchen
- Founded: May 2017 in Pasadena, California
- Defunct: 2023
- Fate: Acquired
- Successor: SBE Entertainment Group
- Headquarters: Pasadena, California, United States
- Key people: Michael Montagano (CEO) Joy Lai (COO) Atul Sood (CBO)
- Number of employees: 82 (2019)
- Website: www.kitchenunited.com

Kitchen United was an American ghost kitchen company based in Pasadena, California, providing equipped professional kitchen space to restaurants for the preparation of delivery-only meals. The company was acquired by SBE Entertainment Group in 2023.

It allowed brick-and-mortar restaurants to expand their food delivery business without adding extra staff or space and allows the creation of restaurants with no dine-in service. In addition to commercial kitchen space, it provides back of house automation and ordering software that accommodates the main delivery services (DoorDash, GrubHub, Uber Eats, etc.).

== History ==
The company was initially funded by GV (formerly Google Ventures), which invested $10 million. GV also contributed to a $40-million series B round of funding that included Fidelity Investments, G Squared Capital and RXR Realty. The company raised a $100-million series C round of funding in July 2021 that included Restaurant Brands International, Kroger, and Couche-Tard / Circle K.

In 2023, Kitchen United was acquired by SBE Entertainment Group, led by Sam Nazarian.
