= LowerMyBills.com =

- Company type: Private
- Industry: Personal Finance, Mortgage, Insurance, Solar, Credit Cards
- Founded: 1999
- Headquarters: Playa Vista, California
- Key people: Graham Skidmore, CEO / Vince Lewis, President / Jeff Hughes, President
- Products: Home Loans, Credit Cards, Auto Insurance, Health Insurance, Solar
- Parent: Rocket Companies
- Website: lowermybills.com

LowerMyBills.com is a consumer finance corporate website owned by Rocket Companies, the parent company of Rocket Mortgage. The company acquired the website in 2017. The site markets offers from mortgage lenders to consumers.

== History ==
LowerMyBills.com was founded by Matt Coffin in 1999. The then privately held company was purchased in 2005 by Experian for $330 million, with performance-based incentives that could add up to an additional $50 million over the next two years. In the year ending March 31, 2005, the company had an operating profit of $26 million on sales of $120 million.

In May 2012, Ybrant Digital announced that it had agreed to purchase PriceGrabber, LowerMyBills, and ClassesUSA.com from Experian. Steve Krenzer was to move from Experian to Ybrant to continue to lead these three businesses. Ybrant expected the purchase to nearly double its revenues.

In September 2012, the purchase of PriceGrabber, LowerMyBills, and ClassesUSA.com from Experian fell through. In October 2012, Experian announced that it had completed the sale of its PriceGrabber, LowerMyBills.com, and ClassesUSA.com to the management teams of those businesses. The company continued operations under the name of Core Digital Media, from Los Angeles, CA. In January, 2017, Rock Holdings Inc., the parent company of Rocket Mortage, acquired LowerMyBills.com and ClassesUSA.com from their parent company Core Digital Media.

== Advertising ==
TNS Media Intelligence reports that the company spent nearly $75 million on web advertisements in 2006 through November, making it one of the medium's largest advertisers. The website's banner ads generally include animations or soundless video clips that are not related to financial matters. The site connects consumers who respond to their marketing with a network of leading service providers. This is done via lead "forms" where consumers voluntarily submit relevant information regarding the transaction under consideration. Consumers can approve who they will be connected with and are told that the service provider will contact them via phone and or email, in compliance with the TCPA and other relevant regulations.
