= Boingo Wireless =

American wireless network company

Boingo Wireless, Inc.
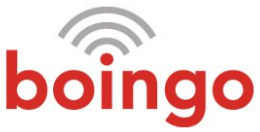
- Type: Private
- Traded as: Nasdaq: WIFI
- Industry: Telecommunications, Wireless, Technology
- Founded: 2001; 25 years ago, in Los Angeles, California
- Founder: Sky Dayton
- Headquarters: 17 Cowboys Way; Suite 400; Frisco, Texas
- Key people: Mike Finley (CEO)
- Products: Wireless broadband technology and services for large public venues including Wi-Fi, distributed antenna systems (DAS) and small cells
- Website: www.boingo.com

Boingo Wireless, Inc. is an American company that designs, builds and manages wireless networks. Its public and private networks include distributed antenna systems (DAS), small cells, macro towers and more than one million Wi-Fi hotspots around the world. The company operates networks for airports, transit stations, stadiums, military bases, hospitals and commercial properties. In December 2022, the company announced it was moving its headquarters to Frisco, Texas, and would maintain regional offices in Los Angeles, New York, Chicago and Las Vegas. The company was listed on the Nasdaq until it was acquired by investment firm Digital Colony Management LLC in 2021.

== History ==
In 2001, Earthlink co-founder Sky Dayton founded Boingo to address the then-fragmented state of Wi-Fi networks. He said he saw how Wi-Fi "could help make the Internet as ubiquitous as the air we breathe".

In March 2007, Boingo acquired Concourse Communications Group, which extended Boingo's services into Wi-Fi and cellular DAS networks at airports.

On November 10, 2008, Boingo acquired Opti-Fi Networks’ Wi-Fi holdings, adding another 25 airport Wi-Fi networks to its portfolio of managed locations and bringing its total of airport Wi-Fi networks to 55.

On May 4, 2011, Boingo Wireless went public, giving the company a market cap of approximately $439 million. The stock price dropped soon afterward, and Boingo's IPO was initially viewed as "less than auspicious", but the stock recovered a year later to its IPO price.

On August 8, 2012, the company acquired Cloud Nine Media, thereby adding advertising services for sponsored Wi-Fi.

On February 21, 2013, the company acquired Endeka Group, a provider of Wi-Fi and IPTV services to military bases and federal law enforcement training facilities.

In November 2013, Boingo announced contracts with the US Air Force, US Army, and US Marines Corps to install IPTV and broadband access networks on their posts.

In September 2013, Boingo announced the acquisition of its largest competitor, Advanced Wireless Group (AWG). At the time of the announcement, AWG operated networks at 17 US airports, including Logan Airport (BOS), Detroit Metropolitan Airport (DTW), Los Angeles International Airport (LAX), and Miami International Airport (MIA). Boingo announced that the combined entity would operate in 60 percent of North America's top 50 airports and more than 40 percent of the world's top 50 airports, reaching more than 1.4 billion passengers annually.

In February 2014, Boingo launched Passpoint Secure hotspot service at 24 US airports, including LAX, Chicago's O'Hare, and New York's JFK and LaGuardia airports. In June 2014, the company partnered with American Express to offer its Platinum card holders free wireless access.

In April 2015, Boingo struck a deal with wireless carrier Sprint Corporation to offload the carrier's customer traffic onto Boingo's Wi-Fi networks at 35 US airports. The deal was reportedly struck to improve Sprint's network performance.

In March 2016, Boingo was subject of a proxy fight when concerns were raised about Boingo's financial performance and the lack of diversity in Boingo's board of directors. A June 2016 settlement ended this proxy fight and Boingo added three directors to its board, including Kathleen Misunas who was the first female board member at Boingo since the company's founding.

As of November 2017, Boingo's market capitalization stood at $1.02 billion.

In July 2018, Boingo deployed a private LTE network using the shared 3.5 GHz Citizen's Broadband Radio Service (CBRS) at Dallas' Love Field Airport. In August, the company acquired Charleston, South Carolina-based multifamily and student housing Wi-Fi provider Elauwit Networks. In November, Boingo announced that it had been selected by the Metropolitan Transportation Authority (MTA) of New York to build and maintain wireless services for the Long Island Rail Road (LIRR) Atlantic Branch and Grand Central Terminal's upcoming East Side Access facility. The two DAS facility deals were reportedly the largest in the company's history.

In February 2019, Boingo expanded a Wi-Fi roaming agreement with AT&T. The deal was designed to offer AT&T subscribers a seamless and complimentary Wi-Fi connection on Boingo's Passpoint-certified networks. In March, CEO David Hagan retired and was replaced by Mike Finley, a former Qualcomm executive. In August, wireless carrier Verizon announced it was partnering with Boingo to bring the carrier's 5G service to indoor public spaces such as stadiums, airports and hotels. In December, the company announced it had realigned its business to focus on higher growth opportunities it was seeing with DAS, carrier offload, military and multi-family housing.

On March 1, 2021, Boingo Wireless Inc. announced that it would be entering into an agreement with Boca Raton, Florida-based investment firm Digital Colony Management LLC to be acquired for an all-cash transaction valued at approximately $854 million. According to a related company press release, the transaction was still pending shareholder approval, regulatory approvals and closing conditions. The transaction completed in June 2021 and the company's stock was delisted from Nasdaq.

On May 27, 2021, Boingo sold off its Multifamily Business to RealPage. The Multifamily Business had been acquired as Elauwit Networks in 2018.

Also in 2021, Boingo launched a private network for the staff at Petco Park in San Diego, home of the Padres baseball team. In October 2022, the company announced it was opening a Boingo Innovation Center in Las Vegas, to demonstrate different wireless technologies. In December 2022, the company announced it was moving its headquarters to Frisco, Texas, and would maintain regional offices in Los Angeles, New York, Chicago and Las Vegas.

== Products and services ==
Boingo acquires long-term wireless rights in large venues like airports, military bases, and stadiums; builds DAS, Wi-Fi, and small cell networks to serve those areas; and monetizes those networks through advertising, carrier fees, or user charges. Its business is divided into higher growth core and legacy business lines and includes the following:

- 5G – Boingo works with Tier One carriers to deploy 5G networks at major airports, stadiums, military bases, hospitals and commercial properties.
- Private Networks – Boingo deploys private LTE networks that operate independently of public networks.
- Distributed antenna system (DAS) - Boingo designs, builds and maintains DAS networks for carriers, to improve cellular coverage in buildings. As of November 2019, Boingo has reportedly deployed 37,200 nodes and claims to be the largest indoor DAS provider in the United States. Its DAS deployments include Chicago's O’Hare International Airport, the Holland and Lincoln Tunnels in New York City, and the Oculus World Trade Center Transportation hub.
- Wi-Fi Offload - Boingo sells wireless carriers the ability to offload their licensed network traffic onto unlicensed spectrum.
- Small cell - Boingo designs and manages small cell networks in venues and sells carriers access to the network. Small cells act as an extension of a macro cellular network and provide more cellular coverage and capacity.
- Boingo Broadband - Boingo provides residential high-speed wireless Internet and IPTV services for troops stationed on US military bases, plus Japan and South Korea.
- Loyalty programs – Consumer brands, such as American Express and Mastercard, offer free Boingo Wi-Fi access to members as part of their card benefits.
- Platform services - Boingo licenses its proprietary software, and provides software integration and development services to customers, allowing them to sell their own Wi-Fi services.
- Roaming services - Boingo sells roaming services across a network of over 1 million hotspot locations to business partners, who use this service to provide mobile Internet services to its customers. The company integrates Hotspot 2.0 technology, also known as Passpoint, allowing users to automatically connect when within range of free Wi-Fi service. Through a roaming deal with Time Warner Cable (now known as Charter Spectrum) announced and launched in 2014, this technology allows newer smartphones with Wi-Fi Alliance-certified Passpoint clients to move between and automatically connect to networks operated by both companies.
- Turn-key Wi-Fi solutions - Boingo sells turn-key Wi-Fi solutions to venue operators, including installation, management, and operation.
- Retail Wi-Fi - Boingo sells Wi-Fi access to end users at a network of managed and operated Wi-Fi hotspots and third party locations around the world.
- Boingo Media - Boingo sells advertising on its Wi-Fi platform. Consumers can receive free Wi-Fi in exchange for watching an ad.

== Awards and recognition ==
- 2009, 2011-2019 - Global Traveler Best Wi-Fi Service
- 2015 - Wireless Broadband Alliance Industry Awards – Best Wi-Fi Network Operator
- 2016 - Light Reading Leading Lights Award – Most Innovative Wireless Service
