= EarthLink =

American Internet service provider

- Logo used since 2020
- Type: Private
- Traded as: Former Nasdaq: ELINK
- Industry: Internet service provider
- Founded: March 1994; 32 years ago (as EarthLink Network, Inc.)
- Founder: Sky Dayton
- Headquarters: Atlanta, Georgia, U.S.
- Key people: Glenn Goad (CEO); Mike Toplisek (president)
- Products: Internet access, premium email, web hosting and privacy and data security products and services
- Number of employees: ~100
- Website: www.earthlink.net

EarthLink is an American Internet service provider.

Earthlink went public on NASDAQ in January 1997. Much of the company's growth was via acquisition. In 2000, The New York Times described it as the "second largest Internet service provider after America Online".

== Overview ==
EarthLink was formed in 1994, and offers services to residential consumers and businesses. As of 2022, EarthLink claimed to have five million users.

EarthLink business Internet sells business telecom services, IT and virtualization, cloud computing, IT security, digital marketing, colocation, hosted applications, and support services. In 2014, the company stated it owned and operated a U.S. network including 29,421 route miles of fiber, 90 metro fiber rings, and eight data centers.

EarthLink's residential consumer services include wireless, fiber, and satellite internet, streaming content bundles, web hosting and e-commerce. Its products include spam filters, anti-virus protection, and cloud storage.

Private equity firm Trive Capital acquired EarthLink in January 2019.

== History ==
=== Early years ===
EarthLink logo from 1998–2015

EarthLink was founded in July 1994 by Sky Dayton when he was 23 years old and resident in Los Angeles. Dayton was convinced of the need for a simple, user-friendly dial-up Internet service provider (ISP) after spending an entire week trying to configure his own computer for Internet access. Dayton set up his own network, going to a CompUSA store, purchasing 14.4 kilobit modems and connecting them all together in Atwater Village, a location he picked because it was the widest possible area to which a local call could be made. The company later moved to Pasadena in 1996.

By 1995, EarthLink offered dial-up service in 98 cities, and was one of the first US ISPs to offer unlimited Internet access for a flat rate. In 1996, they began to offer Internet services for businesses, including ISDN and Frame Relay Internet access and web hosting.

In 1997, Earthlink began to provide 56K dial-up access, doubling the speed of its dial-up service. EarthLink also teamed up with Charter Communications to offer high-speed cable Internet access. In 1998, they entered partnerships with Sprint, Apple, CompUSA, and other companies that helped it reach 1 million members by the end of the year.

In 1999, EarthLink launched its TotalCommerce service for small business Web hosting and also became the first ISP to offer nationwide high-speed Internet access via DSL.

=== MindSpring merger and other acquisitions ===
On February 4, 2000, the company and Atlanta-founded MindSpring merged, making it the second-largest ISP in the U.S., after AOL. Later that year, the company launched EarthLink Biz DSL service. EarthLink also acquired OneMain.com, a large, rural ISP, and Rural Connections in 2001.

In 2001, EarthLink partnered with DirecPC to offer a two-way satellite Internet service. The company also introduced a fixed-IP DSL service for the SOHO business market.

On June 10, 2002, EarthLink acquired PeoplePC, a low-priced dial-up ISP.

EarthLink launched a VoIP phone service for broadband users called Unlimited Voice in April 2003. The company also released several free tools for its members to block spam, viruses, and spyware.

=== New ventures ===
New ventures during the mid 2000s include:

- A joint venture named SK-Earthlink, later renamed Helio, was sold in 2008.
- Earthlink acquired Aluria Software, LLC-a seller of anti-spyware software, based in Lake Mary, Florida.
- New Edge Networks (acquired April 2006) is a provider of network and communication services for businesses.
- Muni-Wireless: In October 2005, Philadelphia, Pennsylvania, and Anaheim, California, selected EarthLink to build their municipal Wi-Fi networks. EarthLink's Municipal Networks division launched public wi-fi networks in Anaheim, Philadelphia, New Orleans, and Milpitas, CA, and won several more municipal contracts; in 2007 EarthLink decided to exit the muni wi-fi business.
- VoIP: EarthLink launched two new voice services between late 2005 and early 2006: a VoIP service called EarthLink trueVoice and a high-speed Internet and voice bundle called EarthLink DSL & Home Phone Service.

In July 2005, EarthLink closed its call centers to reduce costs.

=== New business acquisitions ===
Other acquisitions in the early 2010s included ITC Deltacom, One Communications, STS Telecom, a privately held business in Florida and Georgia. LogicalSolutions.net, part of Synergy Global Solutions in 2011, and Business Vitals, a provider of IT security and professional services. EarthLink also acquired xDefenders, a managed IT security company.

In May 2011, the company created a new EarthLink Carrier division for wholesale customers with fiber-based transport, voice and data service, and switched services.

In July 2013, EarthLink acquired CenterBeam, Inc., a provider of remote managed IT services—with an IT Support Center providing help desk, desktop technical support and application support services.

In August 2023, it was announced EarthLink had acquired the Athens, Texas-headquartered fiber and fixed wireless business internet provider, One Ring Networks for an undisclosed amount.

=== Business network and data center expansion ===
In July 2013, EarthLink completed its previously announced plans to open four new data centers in San Jose, Chicago, Dallas and Miami on its next-generation cloud platform. This brought its total to eight.

In March 2017, EarthLink was acquired by Windstream Holdings, Inc., in an all-stock transaction valued at approximately $1.1 billion, including debt.

In early January 2019, Trive Capital acquired EarthLink for $330 million in cash from Windstream Holdings Inc. In 2021, Earthlink published a statement in which the company confirmed that customers' passwords can be read by its staff. Shortly later, the company deleted this statement without any clarification.

== TotalAccess ==
Earthlink's TotalAccess software bundled various tools, including a dialer, but had initial negative reception both from users and from hardware vendors such as Dell. The 2nd iteration, TotalAccess 2004, added Earthlink Accelerator; a reviewer wrote: "EarthLink says lets dial-up users access Web pages up to 5 times faster."

== Awards and recognition ==
- J.D. Power ranked Earthlink highest for customer satisfaction in 2002, 2003, and 2004.

Other rankings and awards include:

- In October 1996, EarthLink was named "Internet Company of the Year" by the Southern California Software Industry Council.
- In 2000, the company won PC World's World Class Award for Best ISP.
- In 2002, the company was named Top ISP by CNET for the 3rd consecutive year and received a 5-star rating from Smart Business.

== See also ==
- Cidco MailStation
