= Nathan Anderson =

Hindenburg Research founder

Nathan Anderson is the founder of Hindenburg Research, a New York-based investment research firm known for its investigative reports and short-selling strategies. When he announced the closure of Hindenburg in 2025, the Wall Street Journal called him "Wall Street’s Pre-Eminent Short Seller".

== Childhood and early career ==
Anderson's exact birth date is not publicly known, but he was reported to be 38 years old as of early 2023. Anderson grew up in the state of Connecticut, where he attended an Orthodox Jewish day school. He is the son of a university professor and a nurse. During a business podcast, Anderson recalled that he had tried to convince the head rabbi of his school that the Book of Genesis was compatible with the modern theory of evolution.

He earned a degree in international business from the University of Connecticut. Between March 2004 and January 2005, he worked as an ambulance driver in Israel.

He has qualified for two financial professional certifications: Chartered Financial Analyst (CFA) and Chartered Alternative Investment Analyst (CAIA).

He began his financial career working for FactSet Research Systems Inc. He later described his experiences to the Wall Street Journal, saying: "I realized they were doing a lot of run-of-the-mill analysis; there was a lot of conformity." He then took a job vetting potential investments for the private wealth management services of wealthy people. After this initial experience, he founded his first firm, ClaritySpring.

== Later career – forensic reports and short selling ==
Anderson has stated that his decision to specialize in financial fraud investigations was inspired by Harry Markopolos, a financial fraud investigator who was instrumental in uncovering the Bernie Madoff's investment scandal. Anderson reportedly worked with Markopolos on the Platinum Partners investigation, which resulted in seven executives being charged with securities fraud. Around 2014, Anderson began filing whistleblowing reports with U.S. authorities, hoping to collect government bounties for uncovering fraud (for an example of such a program, see the Security and Exchange Commission's Office of the Whistleblower).

Anderson initially established a brokerage firm for hedge funds, specializing in providing due diligence services and fraud reports. By 2017, the brokerage had only managed to accrue a net capital balance of $58,382, while Anderson's landlord filed suit to evict him. These difficulties led Anderson to forgo his brokerage license and start Hindenburg.

In 2018, Anderson founded Hindenburg Research, a small investment management firm specializing in forensic finance investigations. It seeks to unearth 'man-made disasters floating around in the market'. Its website describes its activities as follows:

... we believe the most impactful research results from uncovering hard-to-find information from atypical sources. In particular we often look for situations where companies may have any combination of:

- Accounting irregularities
- Bad actors in management or key service provider roles
- Undisclosed related-party transactions
- Illegal/unethical business or financial reporting practices
- Undisclosed regulatory, product, or financial issues

The firm's first influential report, in September 2020, targeted electric vehicle manufacturer, Nikola Corporation. The report alleged that Nikola was lying about its technology and product performance. The U.S. Securities and Exchange Commission and the U.S. Department of Justice investigated these claims and Trevor Milton, the founder of Nikola, was ultimately convicted of fraud charges. In January 2023, a high-profile Hindenburg report covered alleged massive stock manipulation and accounting fraud by the Adani Group, an Indian conglomerate headed by Gautam Adani, one of the world’s richest men.

Anderson's wealth is not public. He has given many media interviews but has not commented on how much he or Hindenburg make from short investments. In 2021, he said that Nikola was his firm’s biggest win to date. About 10 unnamed investors bankroll some of the firm’s operations, and some of them make their own short bets alongside Hindenburg. Hindenburg Research is not publicly traded, so few rules for information disclosure apply to its top officers. In 2023, the firm was thought to employ about a dozen people.

On January 15, 2025, Anderson announced that he would be disbanding Hindenburg Research since it had “finished the pipeline of ideas we were working on.”

== Political stances ==
=== Support for Israel ===
Wired reported that, Hindenberg Research had donated $20,000 to Polish misinformation twitter account Visegrád 24 and $15,000 from Nathan Anderson. Nathan also said that he secured a soft commitment for funding from Daniel Gross, though his representative said no donation was recorded.
