= Hindenburg Research =

American short-selling activist firm

Hindenburg Research LLC
- Trade name: Hindenburg Research
- Type: Private
- Founded: 2017; 9 years ago
- Founder: Nathan Anderson
- Defunct: January 15, 2025; 22 months ago
- Headquarters: New York City, United States
- Number of employees: 11 (2024)
- Website: hindenburgresearch.com

Hindenburg Research LLC was a U.S. investment research firm with a focus on activist short-selling founded by Nathan Anderson in 2017. Named after the 1937 Hindenburg disaster, which they characterize as a human-made avoidable disaster, the firm generated public reports via its website that allege corporate fraud and malfeasance. Companies that were the subjects of their reports include Super Micro Computer, Adani Group, Nikola, Clover Health, Block, Inc., Kandi, and Lordstown Motors. The reports also featured defenses of the practice of short-selling and explanations of how short-sells "play a critical role in exposing fraud and protecting investors." The firm disbanded in January 2025 with a note on its website from Anderson. At the time, the Wall Street Journal described it as "Wall Street’s Pre-Eminent Short Seller".

In January 2025, Hindenburg Research shut down. Carvana was the subject of Hindenburg's final report.

== Operations ==
Hindenburg Research prepared investigation reports on target companies by going through their public records, internal corporate documents and by talking to employees. Each report was then circulated to Hindenburg's limited partners, who, together with Hindenburg, took out a short position in the target company before publicly releasing the report. Hindenburg profited if the target company's share price declined.

== Notable research ==
=== Nikola report ===
In September 2020, Hindenburg Research published a report on the Nikola Corporation, a company which had teamed up with General Motors to produce hydrogen and battery powered electric trucks, alleging the company of being "an intricate fraud built on dozens of lies" and argued that its founder, Trevor Milton, was responsible for much of the fraudulent activities. Following the release of the report, Nikola's stock dropped by 40% and a Securities and Exchange Commission (SEC) inquiry was opened. While Milton initially disputed the allegations, he later resigned from his position as Executive Chairman and was eventually found guilty of wire and securities fraud. In November 2020, Nikola stated that they had "incurred significant expenses as a result of the regulatory and legal matters relating to the Hindenburg Report.” On February 19, 2025, the company filled for Chapter 11 Bankruptcy, as a result of Hindenburg Research's report.

=== Clover Health report and Chamath Palihapitiya ===
Hindenburg released a report about Medicare Advantage plan of Clover Health in February 2021, claiming that the company neglected to inform investors about it being under investigation by the Department of Justice. The report also argued that billionaire stock promoter and entrepreneur Chamath Palihapitiya neglected his due diligence and misled investors as he took the company public via special purpose acquisition company. Hindenburg disclosed that it had no short or long positions in Clover. Immediately following its publishing, Clover Health dismissed the accusations in the report and also stated it received a notice from the SEC.

=== Adani Group report ===
In January 2023, Hindenburg reported that it had short positions in India's Adani Group and flagged debt and accounting concerns. Concurrently, Hindenburg released a report claiming that Indian conglomerate Adani Group "has engaged in a brazen stock manipulation and accounting fraud scheme over the course of decades." Soon after the report's release, Adani Group companies experienced an acute decline in their share prices. In a follow-up piece, The Guardian indicated that Hindenburg called on the Adani Group to sue if they believed the report was inaccurate. By the end of February 2023, the group lost $150 billion in value. Gautam Adani's personal net worth came down as he fell from 3rd richest in the world to 30th richest within a month after the report was published.

Adani Group responded by accusing Hindenburg Research of launching "a calculated attack" on India. In response, Hindenburg Research released a statement saying that Adani had dodged key questions raised by the firm's report and instead resorted to threats. The firm stated they stand by their statement and dared Adani group to sue.

Due to the allegations, American finance company MSCI cut the free-float status of four Adani firms and Moody's Investors Service downgraded the ratings outlook of four firms. Credit Suisse Group AG stopped accepting bonds of Adani companies as collateral for margin loans to its private banking clients.

The Securities and Exchange Board of India (SEBI) issued a show cause notice to Hindenburg Research, accusing them of using non-public information to short Adani group stocks, causing a $150 billion market value loss. SEBI claims Hindenburg's report misled readers and created panic. Hindenburg denies the allegations, calling SEBI's actions an attempt to silence critics and asserting minimal profits from the Adani shorts.

In August 2024, Hindenburg Research released a report accusing SEBI chairperson Madhabi Puri Buch and her husband, Dhawal Buch of having a stake in dubious offshore entities used to artificially inflate shares of companies owned by the Adani Group. The report says, "We find it unsurprising that SEBI was reluctant to follow a trail that may have led to its own chairperson". The couple later denied the claims.

=== Allegations of illegal activity against Block ===
On March 23, 2023, Hindenburg disclosed a short position in Block, Inc., leading to a 15% drop in the company's shares that day. Hindenburg accused Block of exaggerating user counts, failing to curb fraud and illegal activity on Cash App, and permitting impersonation of high-profile individuals. It also wrote in its report that Block "embraced predatory offerings and compliance worst practices in order to fuel growth and profit from facilitation of fraud against consumers and the government." Block denied the allegations and said it would explore legal action against Hindenburg.

NBC News reported in May 2024 that prosecutors at the Southern District of New York were examining financial transactions and internal practices at Block, stemming from alleged compliance lapses at its Square and Cash App units. According to the report, the company allegedly failed to collect adequate information from customers, processed transactions involving countries subject to economic sanctions, and processed cryptocurrency transactions for terrorist groups. In November 2024, Block disclosed in its earnings report for July–September 2024 that it was negotiating a potential settlement with several state regulators that had probed the company's anti-money laundering program. Block negotiated a $175 million settlement with the Consumer Financial Protection Bureau (CFPB) relating to Cash App's handling of customer complaints and disputes.

=== Icahn Enterprises report ===
In May 2023, Hindenburg released a report on Icahn Enterprises, which fell over 50% in the month after Hindenburg disclosed a short position against it. They classified Icahn Enterprises' dividend structure as "ponzi-like", and noted Jefferies Group's research on Icahn Enterprises as being "one of the worst cases of sell-side research malpractice we’ve seen".

== Additional reports ==
Hindenburg also issued reports concerning the online betting operator DraftKings, the geothermal power plants company Ormat Technologies, electric car company Mullen Technologies, and a Chinese blockchain and cryptomining firm named SOS.

In June 2023, Hindenburg released a report on Dozy Mmobuosi's Tingo Group, where they accused the company of vast amounts of fraud, including misrepresentation of the founder's educational credentials and the existence of many aspects of the business. The report questioned the legitimacy of the company's financial reports and alleged that many of Tingo's claimed partners were not in fact partnered with Tingo. NASDAQ-listed shares in Tingo Group plunged in value after the report. The company denied the Hindenburg claims, which it said contained "errors of fact" and "misleading and libellous content", and appointed lawyers White & Case to review the claims. In September 2024, Mmobuosi was ordered by a US district court to pay a fine of $250mn following an SEC civil complaint.

In August 2023, Hindenburg released a report on Freedom Holding, leading to an investigation by the Department of Justice. An external review conducted by the law firm Morgan, Lewis & Bockius and the forensic accounting firm Forensic Risk Alliance concluded that the allegations made by Hindenburg Research were not supported by evidence.

In August 2024, Hindenburg disclosed a short position in Supermicro, alleging accounting failures ("red flags"). The next day, Supermicro said it would delay the filing of the annual report, causing its stock to collapse over 25%. The U.S. Department of Justice opened a preliminary probe into the company a month after the report, according to The Wall Street Journal. In October 2024, Supermicro's auditors, Ernst & Young resigned after raising significant concerns over the company's internal controls, board independence and accounting practices, which led the company to lose a third of its market value.

== Other activities ==
In October 2021, Hindenburg announced a $1 million reward for information on how the Tether cryptocurrency is pegged to the U.S. dollar and for knowledge on Tether's deposits. Hindenburg included that, at the time, they did not own positions in any cryptocurrency.

In May 2022, Hindenburg took a short position in Twitter, Inc. following the announcement of its acquisition of Twitter by Elon Musk. After Musk's attempted termination of the deal, Hindenburg took a significant long position on Twitter, betting against Musk on the acquisition to close.

The firm had donated $20,000 to Polish misinformation twitter account Visegrád 24 and $15,000 from Nathan Anderson.

== See also ==
- Hunterbrook
- Muddy Waters Research
