= Brian Alvey =

American journalist (born 1970)

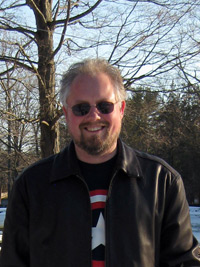
- Alvey in 2009
- Born: March 6, 1970 (age 56); Falls Church, Virginia, U.S.
- Occupations: American serial entrepreneur, programmer, designer and blogger

Brian Alvey (born March 6, 1970, in Falls Church, Virginia) is an American serial entrepreneur, programmer, designer and blogger. He is the chief technology officer of WordPress VIP Platform.. He is best known for co-founding the blog publishing company Weblogs, Inc. with Jason Calacanis.

== Career ==
=== Early years ===
Alvey designed the first TV Guide website in 1995 and helped BusinessWeek move from AOL to the web that year.

He continued designing and developing database-driven web applications for companies including BusinessWeek, Intel, JD Edwards, Deloitte & Touche and The McGraw-Hill Companies. His Tech-Engine career center application has powered more than 200 online career centers including XML.com, Computer User, O'Reilly & Associates Network, DevShed, and the Cold Fusion Developer's Journal. He was also the art director of three print magazines and the Chief Technology Officer of Rising Tide Studios, where he developed The Venture Reporter Network.

Alvey built content management systems for sites designed by Jeffrey Zeldman including the Web design magazine A List Apart (in 1998) and the Kansas City Chiefs. He was the architect of the system that powers the redesigned global network of Capgemini websites.

In 2002, Brian Alvey was the creator and co-host of the Meet The Makers conference, a series of talk show-style events with Jason Calacanis. In 2003 he invented and launched Blogstakes, a sweepstakes application for the blogging community. He was an early investor and chairman of the comic book publishing company ComicMix, which he still advises.

=== Weblogs, Inc./Blogsmith ===
On September 23, 2003, Alvey, along with Jason Calacanis and supported by an angel investment from Mark Cuban, co-founded the publishing company Weblogs, Inc. Weblogs, Inc. was home to such blogs as Engadget, Autoblog, and Joystiq. Time Warner's America Online acquired Weblogs, Inc. in October 2005. in October 2005 for $25–30 million. While at AOL, Alvey was named the chief architect of Netscape and lead the development team which turned it into a social news aggregator. In November 2006, AOL also acquired Blogsmith, the blogging platform Alvey had built to power Weblogs, Inc., for a reported $5 million. At one time, Blogsmith powered 14 of the top 100 blogs.

=== Crowd Fusion/Ceros ===
After AOL, Alvey founded Crowd Fusion, a cloud-native content management system (CMS) company. In July 2008, Crowd Fusion raised $3 million from Velocity Interactive Group, Greycroft Partners, Marc Andreessen and Ben Horowitz. Crowd Fusion's platform customers have included TMZ, The Daily, MySpace, Essence, Tecca and Extra.

In June 2012, Crowd Fusion acquired London-based Ceros. Ceros was spun out of Group FMG, a marketing services company based in London and New York. With that deal Crowd Fusion changed its name to Ceros and appointed Ceros CEO Simon Berg as its CEO. In 2014, Alvey was identified as chief scientist of Ceros.

=== Recurrency/Clipisode ===
Alvey's startup Recurrency was one of seven companies in the Winter 2014/2015 LAUNCH Incubator. Recurrency debuted at the 2015 LAUNCH Conference on March 2 at the Fort Mason Center in San Francisco and on March 4 won Best Incubator Company. In 2016, Recurrency again joined the LAUNCH Incubator and began working on Clipisode, an app for hosting a 5-minute daily talk show featuring friends and fans. Clipisode was announced on stage at the 2016 LAUNCH Conference.

== See also ==
- List of Internet entrepreneurs
