= Computer Currents =

American computer magazine

- Categories: Computer magazine
- Circulation: 612,000
- Publisher: Computer Currents Publishing Corp
- First issue: 1983; 42 years ago
- Final issue: 2000; 25 years ago
- Country: United States
- Based in: California, U.S.
- Language: English
- ISSN: 1090-7572

Computer Currents was a freely distributed United States computer magazine, with local editions across the country. It was often described as a resource for computer shoppers and users, and compared to other regional computer magazines like MicroTimes.

It was launched in 1983 as Computer Classifieds, and was renamed Computer Currents in 1984. Initially distributed in Northern California, the magazine established a franchise in Atlanta in 1987, Dallas/Fort Worth and Houston in 1988, and Chicago in 1993. By 1987, there were also regional editions for Southern California, Austin, New York, and Boston.

As of 1988, it was published biweekly in the San Francisco Bay Area, and monthly in Los Angeles, Boston, Chicago, Texas (Houston, Dallas, Austin), and Atlanta. The magazine's media kit described an audited monthly circulation of approximately 612,000 readers.

The magazine was acquired by and merged into Computer User magazine in 2000.

Computer Currents described itself as:

Computer Currents is the 411/911 magazine. It's a source of help and information for PC and Mac business users of all stripes. Computer Currents doesn't torture-test 200 modems or devote space to industry chitchat. Instead, it focuses on real-world solutions for PC and Mac business users, showing them how to buy products, what products to buy, where to buy them, and how to use them. Computer Currents is fundamentally pro-consumerist, and we'll go undercover to ferret out sloppy service and scams. We're also not afraid to poke fun at the industry. In fact, our Gigglebytes column by Lincoln Spector makes a point of it.

The ISSN for the original Bay Area edition was 1090–7572.
