= Adam Pisoni =

American entrepreneur and founder of Abl Schools

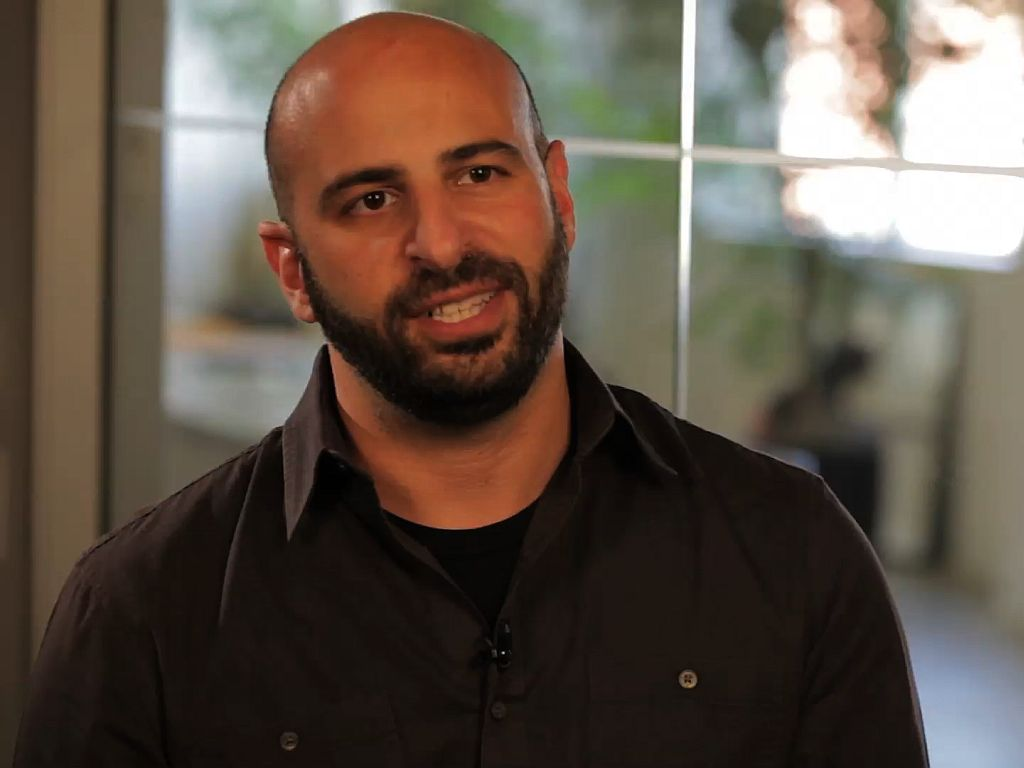
- Pisoni in August 2013
- Born: Long Island, New York, U.S.
- Education: Scottsdale Community College (dropped out)
- Occupation: Tech entrepreneur
- Known for: Co-founder of Yammer

Adam Pisoni is an American entrepreneur and the founder of Abl Schools, a San Francisco-based company which makes educational resource management software. He was previously the co-founder of enterprise social network firm Yammer which was acquired by Microsoft in 2012 for $1.2 billion. Pisoni also served as a Senior Software Engineer at Geni from 2007 to 2008 and Director of Web Engineering at Shopzilla from 2004 to 2007. He also founded web design company Cnation in 1995.

== Early life ==
Pisoni was born in Long Island, New York. When he was four, his family moved to Phoenix, Arizona, where he dropped out of high school in his junior year and enrolled at Scottsdale College. However, during his first year at Scottsdale, he decided to start a business.

== Career ==
In 1995, he co-founded Cnation, a web development firm. At Cnation, Pisoni was CTO from December 1995 to September 2002. However, after the dotcom bubble burst, many of Cnation's clients went out of business or cut back on expenditures, which led to Cnation's failure.

In 2004, Pisoni was the director of web engineering at Shopzilla, formerly known as Bizrate.com. At Shopzilla, he helped with product development and systems architecture.

=== Yammer ===
After a brief stint at Geni.com as a software engineer, Pisoni went on to co-found Yammer, an enterprise social network company where he was CTO, with early PayPal employee and COO David O. Sacks in 2008. Microsoft later bought Yammer for $1.2 billion in 2012.

=== Abl Schools ===
After Microsoft's acquisition of Yammer, Pisoni stayed with Microsoft as a vice president for a couple of years before deciding to found Abl Schools. Abl Schools makes resource and time management software for middle and high schools. As of June 2017, Abl Schools has 12 employees and has raised $12 million in funding.
