= Open Angel Forum =

The Open Angel Forum is a recurring event designed to aid early stage startup companies seeking funding, via presentations to prospective angel investors.

Launched in 2009 by tech entrepreneur and media figure Jason Calacanis, the event was the culmination of a series of public comments by Calacanis questioning the ethics of groups who charge fledgling companies to present to wealthy investors. Calacanis, already co-founder of startup competition TechCrunch50 with Michael Arrington (which ran from 2007 to 2009), had spoken out repeatedly against specific groups he characterized as preying on small, hopeful companies seeking financing.

The conversation evolved quickly over the course of several days, beginning with a blog post calling for "Jihad" against the Keiretsu Forum, a discussion on his online broadcast This Week in Startups, and two impassioned polemics outlining the impetus for creating an alternative model: the first self-described as "declaring war" and "written with boiling blood" quickly followed by a second containing quotes from other prominent tech industry pundits such as Fred Wilson and Brad Feld as well as anonymous individuals claiming to be formerly affiliated or familiar with the groups in question.

Upon formalizing the organization, several principles were outlined regarding qualifications and structure, the most notable legacy of the initial controversy being a strict rule against fees for both presenters and investors for participation. Startups presenting at the Open Angel Forum are picked by the event's organizers (which include regional "chapter heads" as well). Six companies are chosen and each presents for 10 minutes. Angel investors must apply for admission as well, and required to be active, with at least four investments in the past year. The first event was held on January 14, 2009, in Los Angeles and to date events have been held in six cities: Los Angeles, San Francisco, Palo Alto, Boston, Boulder, CO and New York City.

Though news reports and blog postings by participating companies, as well as the organization itself, have touted funding offers following the events, the group does not maintain a comprehensive list of presenters, nor have they announced the success rate or other metrics as to the efficacy of the program as a source for startup capital for participants.
