= Viva Engage =

Enterprise social networking service

- Website type: Enterprise collaboration
- Founded: 10 March 2008; 18 years ago
- Area served: Worldwide
- Owner: Microsoft
- Founders: David O. Sacks; Adam Pisoni
- General manager: Murali Sitaram
- Industry: Internet
- Website: microsoft.com/microsoft-viva/engage
- IPv6 support: Yes
- Registration: Company email
- Launched: 8 September 2008; 18 years ago

Viva Engage (formerly Yammer) is an enterprise social networking service that is part of the Microsoft 365 family of products. It is used mainly for private communication within organizations but is also used for networks spanning various organizations. Access to a Viva Engage network is determined by a user's Internet domain, so only individuals with approved email addresses may join their respective networks.

The service began as an internal communication system for the genealogy website Geni.com and was launched as an independent product in 2008. Microsoft later acquired Yammer in 2012 for US$1.2 billion (~$1.66 billion in 2025). Yammer was renamed to Viva Engage in February 2023. Viva was re-launched as an "employee experience platform" and to make it more community-friendly.

As of October 2026, Viva Engage is included in all enterprise plans of Microsoft 365.

== History ==
=== Pre-acquisition ===
In 2008, Yammer was built as an internal feature for Geni by David O. Sacks and Adam Pisoni. After 6 months of use at Geni, Sacks brought Yammer to TechCrunch50 to showcase its abilities and launch the product as an independent service away from Geni. Yammer won top prize at TechCrunch50, which allowed them to invest more money into the project. It was determined early on that a corporate email address would be required to use Yammer.

In 2009, Yammer underwent its first redesign. The main feature set included profiles, profile photos for groups, following suggestions, and a product called "YammerFox", which was an extension for Firefox that alerted the end user when a message was received.

In 2010, new integrations were launched in the application, such as polls, chat, events, links, topics, Q&A, and ideas. Yammer also launched its own app store, which included Crocodoc and Zendesk. By this time, Yammer had grown to over 1 million total users on the platform. Yammer also released its SharePoint 2007 Integration and transitioned to Scala for its real-time work.

In 2011, Yammer made the move from Scala back to Java for its real-time work due to the complexity of implementing Scala. Yammer Notifications was released as a replacement for YammerFox. During this period, Yammer grew its user base to 4 million total users.

In 2012, Yammer acquired OneDrum, which enabled the implementation of real-time document editing and document edit history. Shortly after, Microsoft acquired Yammer for US$1.2 billion. Microsoft announced that the Yammer team would be integrated into the Microsoft Office division but would continue to report to Sacks.

=== Post-acquisition ===
In 2013, Microsoft integrated Yammer into Dynamics CRM and included Yammer subscriptions in their Office 365 enterprise plans. In 2014, Microsoft announced the transition of Yammer development to the Office 365 development team, while Sacks announced his departure from Microsoft and Yammer. Yammer also introduced the option to log in through Office 365, and there were plans to integrate Yammer into the Office 365 header for easy selection by end users.

In 2015, Yammer removed several features related to how it worked with SharePoint, including support for SharePoint Server 2013. There was renewed focus on the Yammer Embed Feed.

In 2016, Yammer removed the Yammer Enterprise Plan, due to a shift in using the more general Office 365 subscription structure. They also announced that Yammer would integrate with Office 365 Groups as well as allow end users the ability to create and edit Word, PowerPoint, and Excel documents using Office Online.

In 2019, Microsoft announced "the new Yammer", which featured a redesign based on Microsoft's Fluent Design System. In November, they announced full integration into Microsoft Teams, Microsoft's competitor product to Slack.

Logo used until Yammer was replaced by Viva Engage

In February 2023, Microsoft announced that Yammer would be fully integrated into its "employee experience platform" Viva and its own social networking system Viva Engage (which is derived from Yammer), with Yammer to be phased out and replaced by Viva Engage over 2023.

== See also ==
- List of social networking services
