= All-In Podcast =

Business and culture podcast

All-In
- Genre: Business
- Language: English

Cast and voices
- Hosted by: Jason Calacanis
- Starring: Chamath Palihapitiya, David Sacks, and David Friedberg

Publication
- No. of episodes: 240+
- Original release: March 19, 2020
- Provider: YouTube, Spotify, Apple Podcasts

Related
- Website: allin.com

All-In is an American business and technology podcast hosted by four venture capitalists: Chamath Palihapitiya, Jason Calacanis, David Sacks, and David Friedberg. The show delivers long-form discussions of current events, markets, technology, and public policy, in addition to a live events franchise called the "All-In Summit."

Episodes and summit interviews are distributed on YouTube and major podcast platforms. As of 2026, All-In has more than one million YouTube subscribers.

== Hosts ==
- Jason Calacanis is an entrepreneur and angel investor known for early stage technology investments and media projects.
- David Sacks is a co-chair of the President's Council of Advisors on Science and Technology. He is a General Partner at Craft Ventures and a former PayPal executive. He has hosted and spoken at Republican Party events and is active in technology policy debates.
- Chamath Palihapitiya is the founder and CEO of Social Capital. His investments and commentary span health, fintech, and education sectors.
- David Friedberg is the founder and CEO of The Production Board, a holding company focused on food, agriculture, and life sciences.

== History ==
The All-In Podcast launched in March 2020 during the COVID-19 pandemic. Early episodes were recorded remotely as the hosts debated technology, markets, and policy. The show quickly built an audience among founders and investors. In 2022, the hosts expanded the brand with the ticketed All-In Summit, which mixed live interviews with networking events. Recordings from the summits are released on the podcast's channels.

=== Commercial ventures ===
In June 2025, the podcast announced a limited release spirits brand called The Besties All-In Tequila. The inaugural extra anejo was a five-year tequila released in 7,500 numbered bottles at a list price of $1,200. The run sold out within 48 hours.

=== Summit ===
Beginning in 2022, the group launched an annual, multi-day summit with guest speakers.

The All-In Summit launched in Miami Beach, Florida in May 2022. The inaugural program ran May 15 through 17 at the New World Symphony and was limited to roughly 700 attendees drawn from "inspiring founders and investors" and "most accomplished people" in technology and finance circles. The event featured an "application process" to "curate the attendee list" and achieved "40% attendance by women".

The second summit took place in Los Angeles from September 10 to 12, 2023. Programming was staged at Royce Hall on the UCLA campus, featuring "a mix of discussions on investing, technologies, geopolitics" and "thought-provoking banter". The event drew "many Bay Area folks" along with "business operators of all types, founders, building architects, and retired folks". Sessions were later released through the podcast's channels.

The 2024 summit returned to Royce Hall from September 8 to 10, drawing "1,950 attendees paying US$7,500" each. The event was "part political rally, part think tank" that brought together "the best and brightest" in technology and media for long-form interviews.

The 2025 summit was held in Los Angeles from September 7 to 9. Organizers promoted the application process on social media, including LinkedIn and X, and coverage described evening events across the city, including a one night takeover of Universal Studios, a ticket price near 7,500 dollars, and growing emphasis on politics and public policy.

| Year | Location | Venue | Notable Speakers/Features |
|---|---|---|---|
| 2022 | Miami Beach, Florida | New World Symphony | Technology and finance speakers. Attendance about 700 guests. Notable speakers included Elon Musk, Bill Gurley, and Ryan Petersen. |
| 2023 | Los Angeles, California | Royce Hall, UCLA | Panels with technology and media leaders. Sessions released online. Notable speakers included Elon Musk, Ray Dalio, and Brian Armstrong. |
| 2024 | Los Angeles, California | Royce Hall, UCLA | Interviews with technology and media figures. Ticketed audience in the hall. Notable speakers included Elon Musk, Peter Thiel, and JD Vance. |
| 2025 | Los Angeles, California | Royce Hall, UCLA | Citywide program with a Universal Studios takeover. Emphasis on politics and policy. Notable speakers included Neal Mohan, Joe Tsai, and Marc Benioff. |

== Political presence and influence ==
The podcast's audience and the hosts' networks have made All-In a venue for political conversations and fundraising activity. In June 2024, David Sacks hosted a fundraiser in San Francisco that raised about $12 million dollars for Donald Trump's presidential campaign. The event received wide national coverage. During the 2024 cycle, the media company Puck reported that donors associated with the show were preparing to back Trump and other Republican candidates.

After the 2025 inauguration, Trump appeared with the hosts in recorded sessions, including an on-site conversation in the White House Oval Office. On July 23, 2025, the Winning the AI Race summit convened in Washington, D.C., co-hosted by the All-In Podcast and the Hill and Valley Forum. The half-day program was moderated by the four hosts alongside Hill and Valley co-founders Jacob Helberg, Delian Asparouhov, and Christian Garrett, and featured senior administration officials and technology leaders including Chris Power, Shyam Sankar, Paul Buchheit, James Litinsky, and Lisa Su. It served as Trump's first major artificial intelligence address of his second term, following his Day One executive order on AI and previewing an upcoming AI Action Plan. The keynote coincided with Trump's signing of executive orders on AI. The program was released as a special episode.

== Reception ==
The show has been praised by listeners for its insider perspective on venture backed technology and criticized by commentators for its political framing. In 2023, Slate described All-In as "where Silicon Valley's money says what it really thinks", and argued that the program often defaults to familiar conservative talking points. Coverage of the 2024 and 2025 summits portrayed the events as influential gatherings for technology and finance figures, while noting the show's growing role in partisan debates.

In a September 2025 profile, Vanity Fair framed the Los Angeles summit gathering as a "fever-dream capitalist bacchanal" where attendees paying 7,500 dollars circulated between Universal Studios parties, VIP lounges, and nonstop fundraising pitches. The story highlighted the summit's turn into a political staging ground, tracing the hosts' move from Trump critics to MAGA allies across hundreds of podcast episodes. Interviewed guests said the show helped make conservative politics socially acceptable in Silicon Valley and pushed them toward entrepreneurship in what one participant called "uber-capitalism".
