= Groq =

American technology company

Groq, Inc.
- Type: Private
- Industry: Semiconductor industry; Artificial Intelligence; Cloud computing
- Founded: 2016; 10 years ago
- Founders: Jonathan Ross
- Headquarters: Mountain View, California, US
- Key people: Jonathan Ross (CEO), Sunny Madra (COO)
- Products: Language Processing Unit (LPU)
- Revenue: US$500 million (2025)
- Net income: US$−88 million (2023)
- Number of employees: 250 (2023)
- Website: groq.com

Groq, Inc. is an American artificial intelligence (AI) company that builds an AI accelerator application-specific integrated circuit (ASIC). The architecture was originally introduced as a Tensor Streaming Processor (TSP) but was later rebranded as a Language Processing Unit (LPU) following the widespread adoption of large language models after the breakthrough of ChatGPT. The company also develops related computer hardware and software to accelerate AI inference performance.

Examples of the types of AI workloads that run on Groq's LPU are: large language models (LLMs), image classification, and predictive analysis.

Groq is headquartered in Mountain View, California, and has offices in San Jose, California, Liberty Lake, Washington, Toronto, Canada, London, U.K. and remote employees throughout North America and Europe.

In December 2025, Nvidia and Groq announced an agreement reportedly valued at approximately US$20 billion to license Groq's AI inference technology and to transfer several senior Groq executives to Nvidia. Groq stated that it would continue to operate as an independent company.

== History ==
Groq was founded in 2016 by a group of former Google engineers, led by Jonathan Ross, one of the designers of the Tensor Processing Unit (TPU), an AI accelerator ASIC, and Douglas Wightman, an entrepreneur and former engineer at Google X (known as X Development), who served as the company’s first CEO.

Groq received seed funding from Social Capital's Chamath Palihapitiya, with a $10 million investment in 2017 and soon after secured additional funding.

In April 2021, Groq raised $300 million in a series C round led by Tiger Global Management and D1 Capital Partners. Current investors include: Infinitum, The Spruce House Partnership, Addition, GCM Grosvenor, Xⁿ, Firebolt Ventures, General Global Capital, and Tru Arrow Partners, as well as follow-on investments from Infinitum, TDK Ventures, and XTX Ventures. After Groq’s series C funding round, it was valued at over $1 billion, making the startup a unicorn.

On March 1, 2022, Groq acquired Maxeler Technologies, a company known for its dataflow systems technologies. It was decided Maxeler would maintain its brand due to the longstanding accomplishments of Dr. Oskar Mencer and team, publishing research in their field of expertise.

On August 16, 2023, Groq selected Samsung Electronics' foundry in Taylor, Texas to manufacture its next-generation chips, on Samsung's 4-nanometer (nm) process node. This was the first order at this new Samsung chip factory.

On February 19, 2024, Groq soft-launched a developer platform, GroqCloud™, to attract developers into using the Groq API and rent access to their chips. On March 1, 2024 Groq acquired Definitive Intelligence, a startup known for offering a range of business-oriented AI solutions, to help with its cloud platform.

Groq raised $640 million in a series D round led by BlackRock Private Equity Partners in August 2024, valuing the company at $2.8 billion.

On February 10, 2025, Groq announced that it had secured a US$1.5 billion commitment from the Kingdom of Saudi Arabia to expand delivery of its LPU-based AI inference infrastructure, tied to a new GroqCloud data center in Dammam, Saudi Arabia.

As of 2025, Groq has established a dozen data centers across the U.S., Canada, the Middle East, and Europe, with its technology.

In December 2025, Nvidia agreed to purchase assets from Groq for approximately US$20 billion, which is a record for Nvidia. Groq has described this as a non-exclusive licensing deal. As part of the deal, Groq founder Ross and Groq president Sunny Madra would join Nvidia. In May 2026, Groq was reported to be raising $650 million from existing investors to fund its transition to an AI inference cloud business, with the round structured as a pro-rata offering backstopped by investors Disruptive and Infinitum.

== Language Processing Unit ==
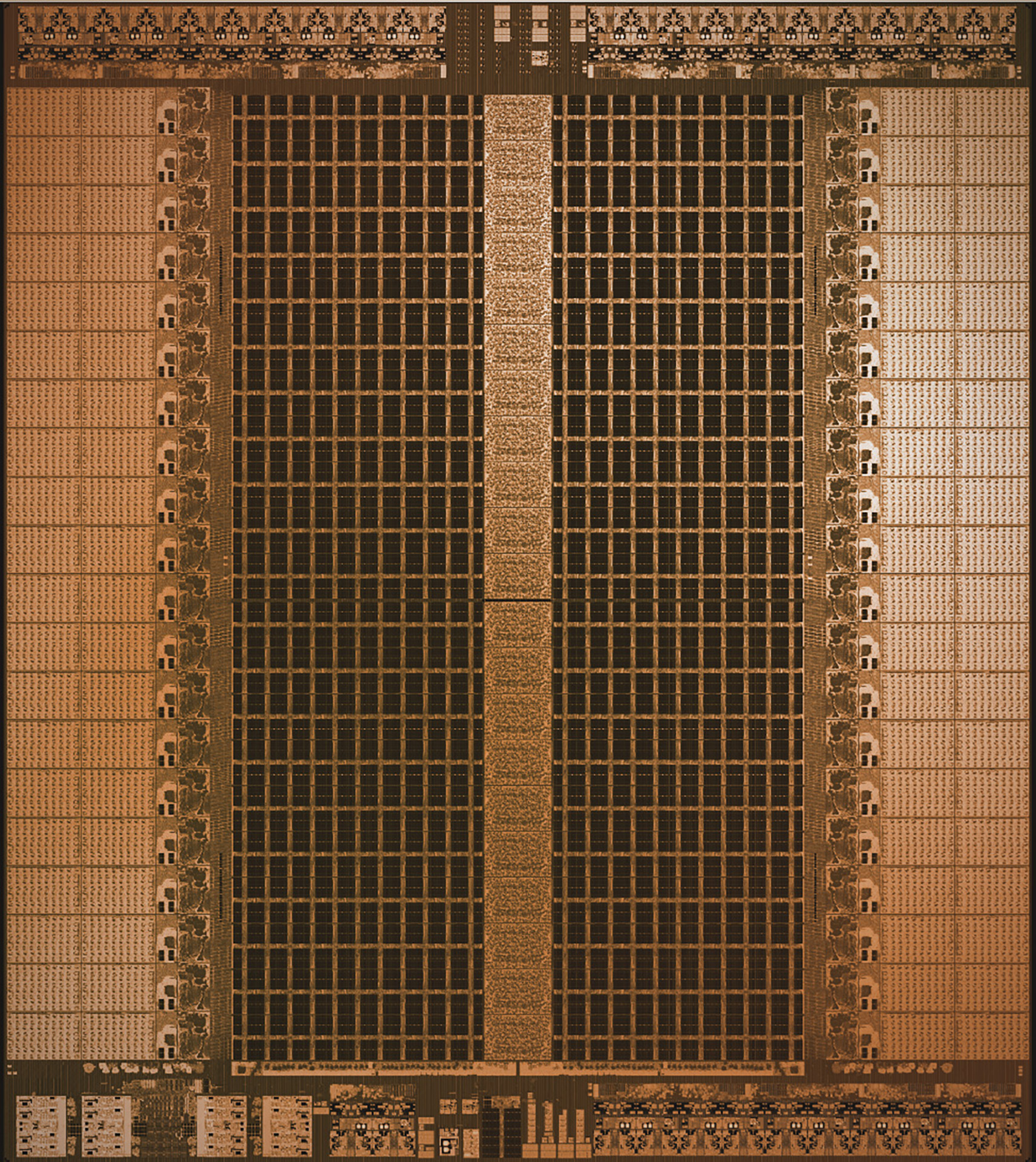
A die photo of Groq’s first streaming processor

Groq's initial name for their ASIC was the Tensor Streaming Processor (TSP), codenamed "Alan", but was later rebranded by Mark Heaps (VP of Brand), and Jonathan Ross (CEO/Founder) from the TSP to the Language Processing Unit (LPU) to make the nature of the processor more obvious.

The LPU features a functionally sliced microarchitecture, where memory units are interleaved with vector and matrix computation units. This design facilitates the exploitation of dataflow locality in AI compute graphs, improving execution performance and efficiency. The LPU was designed off on two key observations:

1. AI workloads exhibit substantial data parallelism, which can be mapped onto purpose-built hardware, leading to performance gains.
2. A deterministic processor design, coupled with a producer-consumer programming model, allows for precise control and reasoning over hardware components, allowing for optimized performance and energy efficiency.

In addition to its functionally sliced microarchitecture, the LPU can also be characterized by its single-core, deterministic architecture. The LPU can achieve deterministic execution by avoiding the use of traditional reactive hardware components (branch predictors, arbiters, reordering buffers, caches) and by having all execution explicitly controlled by the compiler thereby guaranteeing determinism in execution of an LPU program.

The first generation of the LPU (TSP) yields a computational density of more than 1TeraOp/s per square mm of silicon for its 25×29 mm 14nm chip operating at a nominal clock frequency of 900 MHz. The second generation of the LPU (LPU v2) will be manufactured on Samsung's 4nm process node.

Groq hosts open-source large language models running on its LPUs for public access. Access to these demos is available through Groq's website and its playground for Developers.

== See also ==
- Central processing unit
- Graphics processing unit
- Tensor processing unit
