= David Sacks =

South African-American entrepreneur (born 1972)

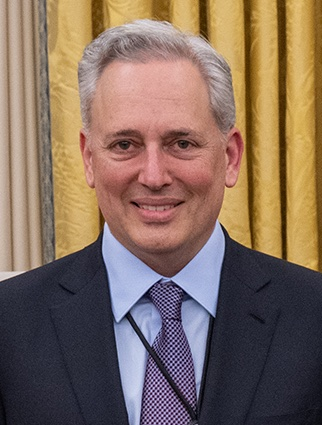
- Sacks in 2025

Co-Chair of the President's Council of Advisors on Science and Technology
- Incumbent
- Assumed office January 23, 2025 Serving with Michael Kratsios
- President: Donald Trump
- Preceded by: Frances Arnold; Maria Zuber; Arati Prabhakar

Special Advisor for AI and Crypto
- In office January 20, 2025 – March 26, 2026
- President: Donald Trump
- Preceded by: Position established
- Succeeded by: Jay Clayton (Note: As the White House AI czar.)

Personal details
- Born: David Oliver Sacks; May 25, 1972 (age 54) Cape Town, South Africa
- Spouse: Jacqueline Tortorice (m. 2007)
- Children: 3
- Education: Stanford University (BA); University of Chicago (JD)
- Known for: Former CEO of Zenefits; Former COO of PayPal; Founding CEO of Yammer

David Oliver Sacks (born May 25, 1972) is a South African-American entrepreneur, author, and investor in internet technology firms. He is a general partner of Craft Ventures, a venture capital fund he co-founded in late 2017. Additionally, he is a co-host of the All In podcast, alongside Chamath Palihapitiya, Jason Calacanis and David Friedberg. Previously, Sacks was the COO and product leader of PayPal, and founder and CEO of Yammer. In 2016, he became interim CEO of Zenefits for ten months. In 2017, Sacks co-founded Craft Ventures, an early-stage venture fund. His angel investments include Facebook, Uber, SpaceX, Palantir Technologies, and Airbnb. In December 2024, President Donald Trump named Sacks the White House AI and crypto czar for the incoming administration; he stepped down in March 2026.

== Early life ==
Sacks was born to a Jewish family in Cape Town, South Africa, and emigrated to Tennessee, United States, with his family when he was five. Though Sacks did not know he wanted to become an entrepreneur, he did not want to work in a profession like his father, who was an endocrinologist. He says he took inspiration from his grandfather, who started a candy factory in the 1920s.

Sacks attended Memphis University School in Memphis, Tennessee. He earned a bachelor's degree in economics from Stanford University in 1994 and a Juris Doctor degree from the University of Chicago Law School in 1998.

== Career ==
=== PayPal ===
In 1999, Sacks left his job as a management consultant for McKinsey & Company to join Max Levchin, Peter Thiel, and Luke Nosek's e-commerce startup Confinity. Later that year, Sacks was the inaugural product leader of Confinity's milestone product, and corporate successor, PayPal. Upon promotion to Paypal COO, he built many of the company's key teams, and was responsible for product management and design, sales and marketing, business development, international, customer service, fraud operations, and human resources functions. PayPal had their initial public offering in February 2002. It was one of the first IPOs after the September 11 attacks. The stock rose more than 54% on the first day. In October 2002, eBay acquired PayPal for $1.5 billion.

Sacks is a member of the so-called "PayPal Mafia", a group of founders and early employees of PayPal who went on to found a series of other successful technology companies. They are often credited with inspiring Web 2.0 and the re-emergence of consumer-focused Internet companies after the dot-com bubble bust of 2001.

=== Film producer ===
Following PayPal's acquisition, Sacks produced and financed the political satire Thank You for Smoking, which premiered at the 2005 Toronto International Film Festival, was acquired by Twentieth Century Fox for theatrical release in 2006, and was nominated for two Golden Globes, including 'Best Motion Picture.'

Sacks developed and produced the 2023 biopic Dalíland about artist Salvador Dalí. Dalíland premiered at the 2022 Toronto International Film Festival and was acquired by Magnolia Pictures for theatrical release in 2023.

=== Geni.com ===
In 2006, Sacks founded Geni.com, a genealogy website. In 2008, Sacks and co-founder Adam Pisoni spun off an internal communications tool created by Geni employees to communicate with each other into a standalone company called Yammer. Geni was acquired by MyHeritage in 2012.

=== Yammer ===
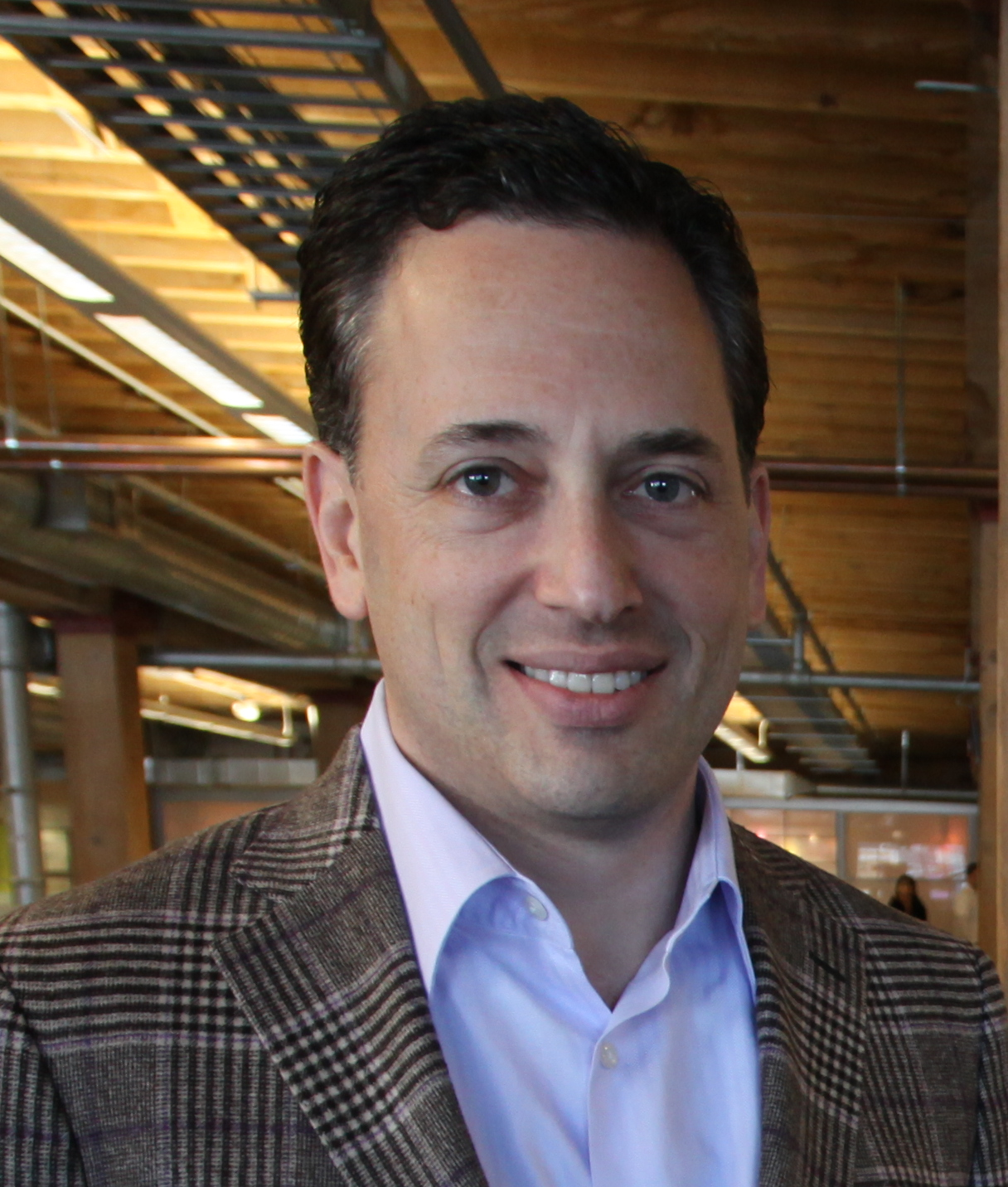
Sacks in 2011

In 2008, Yammer launched the first enterprise social network, a secure solution for internal corporate communication and collaboration, winning the grand prize at TechCrunch50 conference. According to Social Capital, Yammer's viral approach made it among the fastest-growing Software-as-a-Service (SaaS) companies in history, exceeding eight million enterprise users in just four years. Yammer received approximately $142 million in funding from venture capital firms such as Charles River Ventures, Founders Fund, Emergence Capital Partners, and Goldcrest Investments.

In July 2012, Microsoft acquired Yammer for $1.2 billion as a core part of its cloud/social strategy.

=== Zenefits ===
In December 2014, Sacks made a "major investment" in Zenefits. In January 2016, Zenefits' board asked him to step in as interim CEO amidst mounting regulatory issues and financial underperformance. The outgoing CEO, founder Parker Conrad, said he was unfairly forced out and likened Sacks' actions to a "coup."

Over the next year, Sacks negotiated a resolution with insurance regulators across the US, receiving praise for "righting the ship". Sacks also revamped Zenefits' product line with an initiative he named "Z2", introducing a SaaS business model. Shortly after, PC Magazine noted that Zenefits had become "the best HR software on the market," while Buzzfeed reported the company was losing over $200 million annually. After just 10 months in the role, Sacks was succeeded by former Ooyala CEO Jay Fulcher.

=== Craft Ventures ===
In late 2017, Sacks co-founded Craft Ventures and raised an initial fund of $350 million.

According to the company’s Medium posts, Craft Ventures raised a $500 million fund in 2019, announced two new funds in 2021, totaling $1.3 billion and bringing total assets under management to $2 billion, and announced Ventures IV and Growth II in 2023, totaling $1.3 billion and bringing the firm’s assets under management to $3.3 billion.

=== Callin ===
In 2021 Sacks launched a podcast platform called "Callin", raising $12 million in Series A funding. In 2023, Callin was acquired by Rumble.

=== Glue ===
Also in 2021, Sacks and his former colleague from Craft, Evan Owen, co-founded a workspace chat company called Glue. Their product is an AI tool that could be invoked from specific chats on platforms like Google Meet and Zoom, allowing employees to get AI assistance during conversations. It was launched to the public in May 2024.

== Political career ==
On December 5, 2024, President Donald Trump named Sacks the White House AI and crypto czar, a newly created role with the goal of building a legal framework for the cryptocurrency industry. Following Trump's inauguration, a Crypto Ball was held where David Sacks declared that, "The war on crypto is over." Trump also named him to lead the President's Council of Advisors on Science and Technology.

Sacks with U.S. President Donald Trump, Mark Zuckerberg, and Chamath Palihapitiya at a White House dinner, September 4, 2025

Trump said that Sacks would "safeguard Free Speech online, and steer us away from Big Tech bias and censorship." Trump further stated that Sacks would "work on a legal framework so the crypto industry has the clarity it has been asking for, and can thrive in the U.S."

According to Bloomberg News, Sacks would be a "special government employee," allowing him to work for the government for a maximum of 130 days per year, with or without compensation. This status exempts him from undergoing confirmation hearings and from specific financial disclosure requirements. Before taking office, Sacks and Craft Ventures sold their direct cryptocurrency holdings, while still maintaining his investments in crypto startups.

Sacks announced the end of his tenure as crypto czar in March 2026, although he remained as co-chair on the Council of Advisers.

=== Reaction to appointment ===
The appointment of Sacks sparked various reactions. The tech community, particularly those with conservative-libertarian leanings, viewed it as an opportunity for less regulation and more innovation, aligning with Trump's promises to promote cryptocurrency and challenge previous AI policies to compete with China. Sacks, known for his involvement in Trump's campaign, including hosting a fundraiser and speaking at the Republican National Convention, underscores his political alignment.

Concerns were raised about potential conflicts of interest due to Sacks' continued involvement in the private sector. Critics highlighted the lack of traditional governmental oversight since he will serve as a "special government employee", which does not require Senate confirmation or full financial disclosure. This arrangement led to debates about transparency and accountability, especially as Sacks maintained his business interests while potentially influencing policy.

AI safety advocates also criticized Sacks over his opposition to regulations related to Silicon Valley. Sam Altman of OpenAI expressed confidence in the integrity of such appointees.

== Political views ==
According to a 2024 New York Times article, "Over the last few years, Mr. Sacks, a longtime associate of Elon Musk and Peter Thiel, has transformed from a prominent Silicon Valley executive into an unlikely media celebrity for would-be entrepreneurs, especially those leaning right, who listen to his popular All-In podcast."

According to The New Republic, "Sacks is using his wealth and online clout to unite conservatives and former leftists in a reactionary movement against liberalism".

=== The Diversity Myth ===
After graduating from Stanford, Sacks co-authored with Peter Thiel the 1995 book The Diversity Myth: Multiculturalism and the Politics of Intolerance at Stanford, published by the Independent Institute. The book is critical of political correctness in higher education and argues that more intellectual diversity is needed on college campuses. The following year, writing for Stanford Magazine, he argued against affirmative action in the United States, saying that it had hurt the "disadvantaged", not helped them, and had led to increased segregation at Stanford in the name of "diversity".

=== Support for political campaigns ===
According to the Federal Election Commission, Sacks donated $50,000 to Republican Party candidate Mitt Romney's presidential campaign in 2012. In 2016, he donated nearly $70,000 to Democratic Party candidate Hillary Clinton's presidential campaign.

In the 2022 San Francisco Board of Education recall elections, Sacks gave one of the largest contributions to support the recall. He is also a significant booster of Republican candidates, sponsoring a spring 2022 fundraiser for GOP Senate hopefuls including JD Vance and Blake Masters alongside his former colleague and partner Keith Rabois. In total, Sacks directly gave over $1 million to Senate candidates in 2022.

Sacks was the moderator when Ron DeSantis announced his 2024 presidential campaign on Twitter Spaces on May 24, 2023. He praised DeSantis and donated $50,000 to his campaign. Later in June 2023, Sacks hosted a $10,000 per plate fundraiser for Robert F. Kennedy Jr. He also hosted a campaign fundraiser for Donald Trump at his home in June 2024, which raised around $12 million. Sacks was a speaker at the 2024 Republican National Convention. He voted for Trump in the 2024 presidential election.

=== Russian invasion of Ukraine ===
Since October 2022, Sacks has been commenting on the Russian invasion of Ukraine, taking a view against US involvement in Ukraine, and especially US military assistance for Ukraine. During the 2024 Republican National Convention, Sacks said that the United States had "'provoked' Russia to invade Ukraine" and denied a claim that delegates booed him for his anti-interventionist remarks.

=== Silicon Valley Bank bank run ===
Following the collapse of Silicon Valley Bank, Sacks advocated for urgent government action to prevent the bank run from spreading to other regional banks.

== Personal life ==
On July 7, 2007, Sacks married Jacqueline Tortorice. The couple have two daughters and one son. They live on Broadway in Pacific Heights, San Francisco, in an area known as "Billionaire's Row". In June 2024, they hosted a sold-out fundraiser for Donald Trump at their home, with tickets from $50,000 to $300,000 per person.

For his 40th birthday, Sacks rented the Fleur de Lys mansion in Los Angeles and threw a Marie Antoinette-themed party.

In December 2025, Sacks moved to Austin, Texas where he opened another Craft Ventures office.
