= Ceros =

Interactive content development platform

Ceros, Inc.
- Website type: Software
- Founded: 2007
- Headquarters: New York City, USA
- Founders: Brian Alvey, Simon Berg, Dominic Duffy, Craig Wood
- Revenue: $50,000,000
- Website: www.ceros.com

Ceros is a cloud-based platform encompassing a collaborative, real-time digital canvas, upon which designers create animated, interactive content without the need for developers.

The published content works across desktop and mobile devices and can be integrated with e-commerce systems using the Ceros e-commerce SDK. Ceros' platform analytics mechanism works in real-time and reports engagement metrics.

== Investment history ==
Founded by Brian Alvey in 2007 as Crowd Fusion, the company acquired London-based Ceros in 2012 and assumed the acquired company's name. CEO of the acquired company, Simon Berg, became the CEO of the newly combined entity. Crowd Fusion initially raised $3 million from Velocity Interactive Group (now Fuse Capital), Greycroft Partners and Marc Andreessen. Having won customers such as ShopBazaar, Mini, Stella McCartney, Frette, Moncler, Urban Outfitters, Tourneau, Peugeot, Habitat, Monsoon and Virgin Atlantic in its first year, the company attracted a further $6.2 million investment from Greycroft, Sigma Prime and Starvest Partners in March 2014. In 2020, Ceros raised $100 million led by Sumeru Equity Partners along with its existing investors.
