= Jason Calacanis =

American businessman (born 1970)

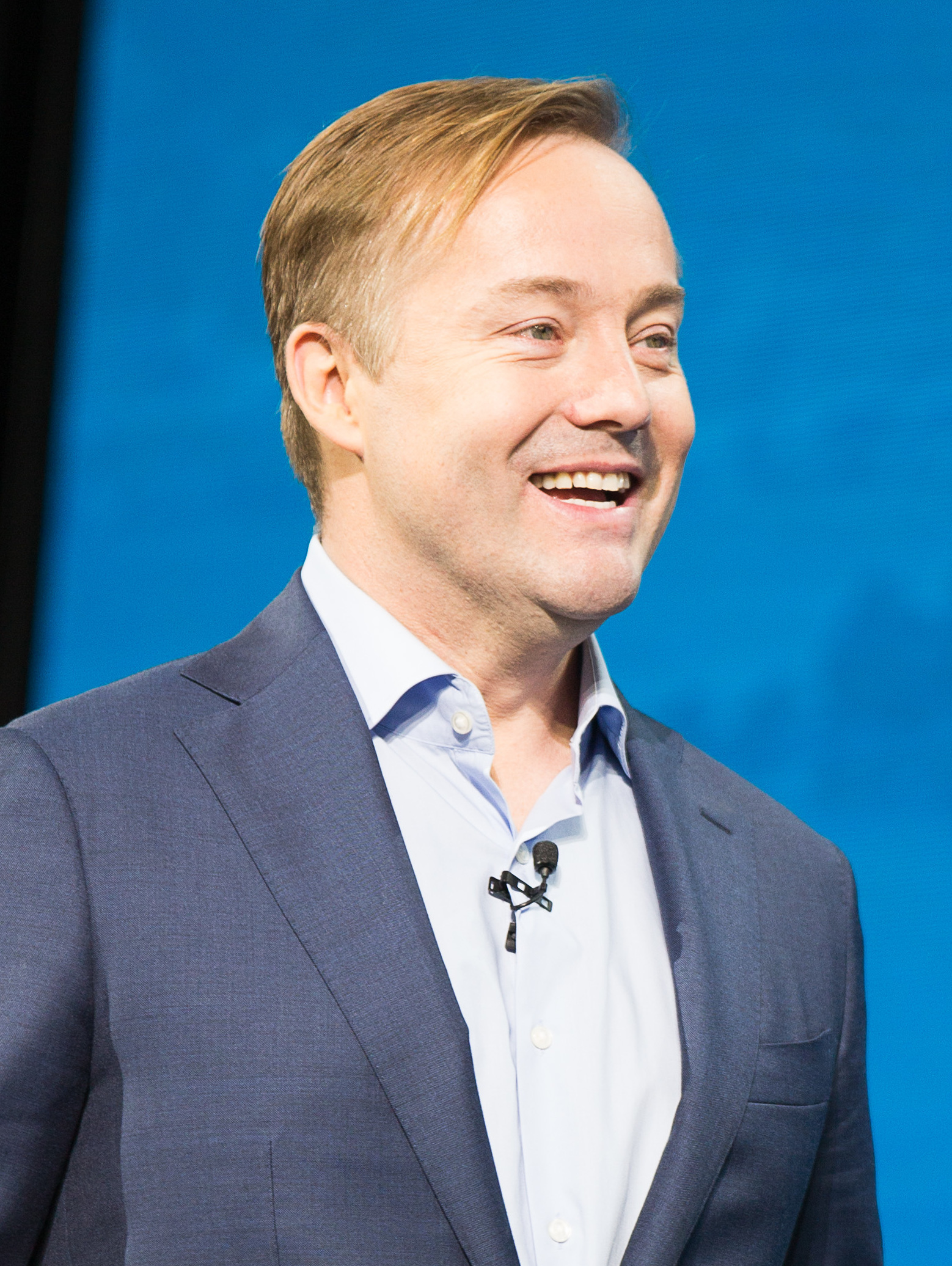
- Calacanis in 2018
- Born: Jason McCabe Calacanis; November 28, 1970 (age 55); New York City, New York, U.S.
- Education: Fordham University (BA)
- Spouse: Jade Li (m. after 2006)
- Children: 3

Jason McCabe Calacanis (born November 28, 1970) is an American podcaster, Internet entrepreneur, angel investor, and author.

His first company, Rising Tide Studios, was part of the dot-com era in New York. His second venture, Weblogs, Inc., a publishing company that he co-founded together with Brian Alvey, capitalized on the growth of blogs before being sold to AOL. Calacanis is also an angel investor in various technology startups and co-host of the All-In podcast alongside David Sacks, Chamath Palihapitiya, and David Friedberg, and the host of the This Week in Startups and This Week in AI podcasts.

== Early life ==
Calacanis was born in the Bay Ridge section of Brooklyn, New York, and has two brothers. He is of half-Greek and half-Irish descent. He graduated from Xaverian High School in 1988 and attended Fordham University, where he received a B.A. in psychology.

== Career ==
Calacanis started his career in the 1990s as a reporter covering the internet industry in New York.

Calacanis was the founder and CEO of Rising Tide Studios, a media company that published print and online publications. During the dot-com boom, Calacanis was active in New York's Silicon Alley community, and in 1996 began producing the Silicon Alley Reporter. Originally a 16-page photocopied newsletter, it eventually expanded into a 300-page magazine, with a sister publication called the Digital Coast Reporter for the West Coast. Calacanis' socializing earned him a nickname as the "yearbook editor" of the Silicon Alley community. The company also organized conferences in New York, Los Angeles, and San Francisco focused on the Internet, web, and New Media.

Calacanis co-founded the blog network Weblogs, Inc. with Brian Alvey on September 24, 2003, and the startup was supported by an angel investment from Mark Cuban.

Two years after its inception, the Weblogs, Inc. blogs business was generating $1,000 a day from AdSense. Time Warner's America Online agreed to buy Weblogs, Inc. in October 2005 for $25–30 million.

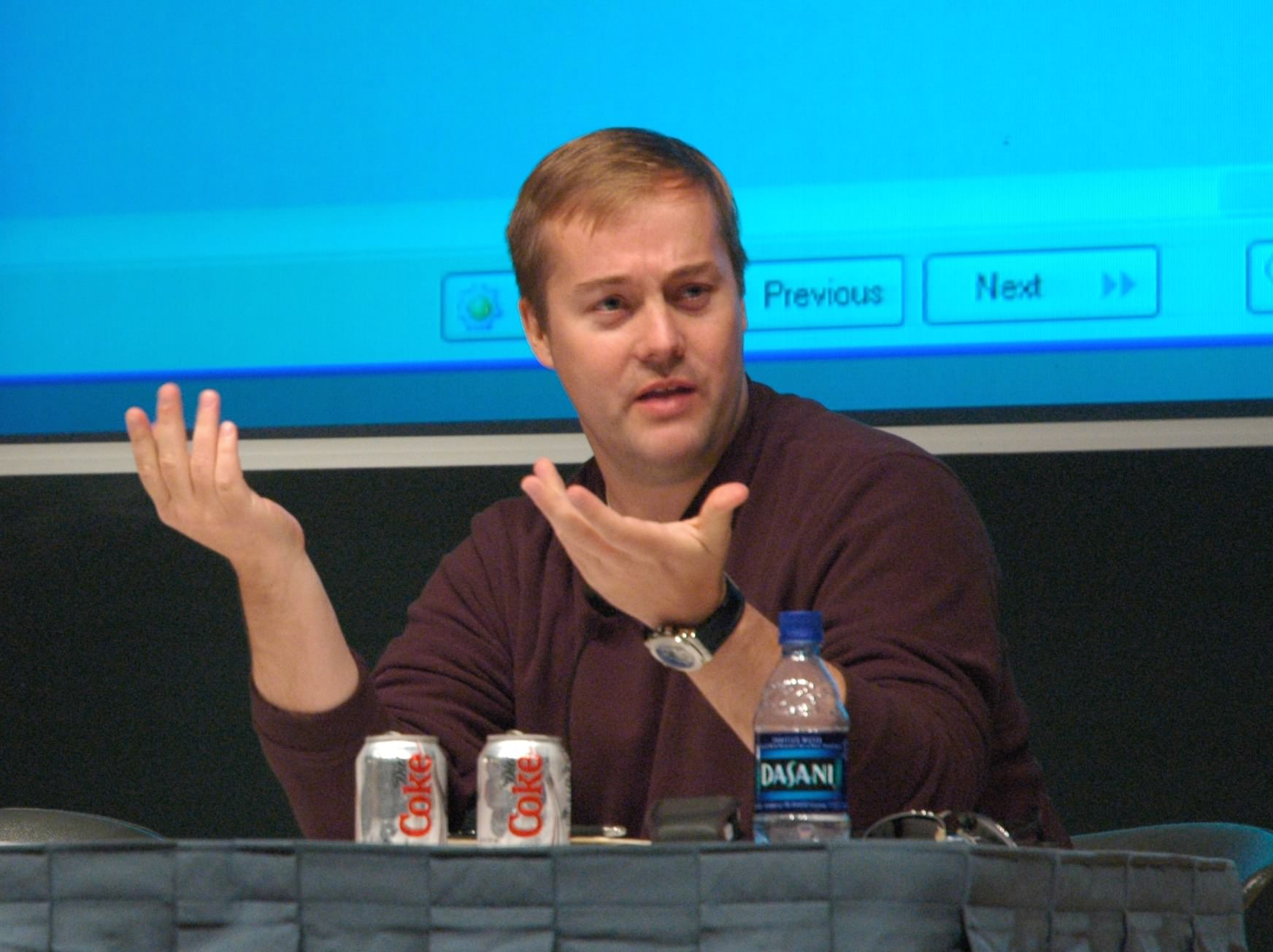
Calacanis speaking at the 2005 Gnomedex

On November 16, 2006, TechCrunch reported that Calacanis had resigned from his position as CEO of Weblogs, Inc. and general manager of Netscape. Calacanis later confirmed this on his blog and the Gillmor Gang podcast.

Calacanis joined Sequoia Capital, a venture capital firm, as an EIA (entrepreneur in action) in December, 2006, a position which he held until May, 2007. Through this program, Calacanis invested $25K in Travis Kalanick's company, Uber. As of 2017 the investment was worth roughly $100 million.

In 2007, Calacanis is credited with starting an internet trend he called "fatblogging" after being fed up with being overweight. Fatblogging is when a person loses weight by exercising and then posting their weight afterwards onto their blog for encouragement and support from commenters and other fatbloggers.

Calacanis is known to be an enthusiastic recreational poker player and has participated in several high-profile games within the technology and startup community. His interest in poker has been mentioned in relation to the broader Silicon Valley culture, where the game is often used as a social and strategic activity among founders and investors.

He has appeared as a guest player on PokerStars The Big Game, a televised high-stakes cash-game format in which amateur players compete alongside professional poker players and well-known personalities. The show features a “loose cannon” format, where invited non-professional players receive a bankroll to compete against experienced opponents.

He launched the web directory Mahalo ("thank you" in Hawaiian), which raised $20 million in venture capital from investors including Sequoia Capital, News Corp, CBS, Mark Cuban, and Elon Musk. Mahalo hit a peak of 15 million unique visitors a month and achieved profitability in 2011, but suffered a sharp decline in traffic that year from the Google Panda search algorithm update and shut down in 2014.

Calacanis founded ThisWeekIn.com, which shut down in 2012 but is live again and available as a weekly podcast.

This Week in Startups (also called TWiSt) is a show founded and hosted by Calacanis. The show was co-hosted by Molly Wood from 2021 to 2023. Molly left the podcast in 2023 for unnamed reasons.

He also founded a startup Inside.com which focuses on delivering thematic newsletters. The company raised $2.6 million.

In June 2019, Calacanis partnered with the NSW Government to create the Sydney Launch Festival for startups to give their pitches to global audiences.

After Elon Musk acquired Twitter in 2022 and re-organized the management and governance structure, Calacanis helped transition Twitter along with David Sacks.

=== Angel investing ===
In 2009, Calacanis founded the Open Angel Forum, an event that connects early-stage startups with angel investors. The forum was the culmination of a series of public comments by Calacanis questioning the ethics of pay-to-pitch angel forums. Calacanis believes startups shouldn't have to pay to pitch angel investors, criticizing groups like Keiretsu Forum for charging fees that can range from $1,000 to $8,000 for a single 10- or 15-minute presentation. Calacanis is an angel investor in Robinhood, Wealthfront, Uber, Desktop Metal, Datastax, Thumbtack, Superhuman and Trello.

Calacanis raised a $10 million fund for his own venture investment firm to invest in startups that emerged from the Launch conference. Limited partners in the fund include David Sacks. Following the success of the Launch conference, Calacanis declared his intent to get closer and more involved in the new ventures that emerged from that conference. The level of investment was around $25,000 to $100,000 in five to 10 startups per year.

In 2016, Calacanis was banned from attending Y Combinator's Demo Day. According to a post on Hacker News by then-president of Y Combinator Sam Altman, the decision to exclude Calacanis was driven by feedback received from YC founders regarding their interactions with him.

Calacanis publicly announced in 2018 that he had sold all of his Facebook stock, expressing sharp criticism of company CEO and co-founder Mark Zuckerberg on the Too Embarrassed to Ask podcast. He called Zuckerberg "completely immoral" in how he runs the business and said, "No founder should ever sell a company to him."

Calacanis authored a book titled "Angel: How to Invest in Technology Startups—Timeless Advice from an Angel Investor Who Turned $100,000 into $100,000,000" on angel investing published by HarperCollins in 2017.

In 2018, Calacanis invested in Calm, a meditation app that is valued at $1 billion.

== Podcasting ==
=== This Week in Startups ===
This Week in Startups
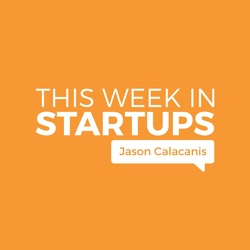

Cast and voices
- Hosted by: Jason Calacanis and Molly Wood

Related
- Website: thisweekinstartups.com

This Week in Startups is a weekly podcast created and hosted by Calacanis. The Wall Street Journal contributor Cecilie Rohwedder described the podcast as "an influential Web series filmed in the U.S."

==== History ====
Plans for the podcast were announced on March 16, 2009, through a blog post. The 60-minute program premiered on May 1, 2009, featuring Brian Alvey, CEO and founder of the content management and hosting system Crowd Fusion, as its first guest. The earliest episode on YouTube dates back to June 3, 2010 titled "This Week in Venture Capital - Mark Suster and Jason Calacanis.

==== Reception ====
This Week in Startups was listed in an article at Fortune.com titled "The Ultimate Guide to the Best Business Podcasts".

=== All-In ===
As of 2022, Calacanis is co-host of the All-In podcast, alongside Chamath Palihapitiya, David O. Sacks, and David Friedberg. In May 2022, the All-In Podcast team hosted their first All-In Summit in Miami, where leaders in business and tech attended to discuss the central theme of "What problem do you want to solve right now?"

== Personal life ==
Calacanis married Jade Li sometime between 2006 and 2009.

Calacanis was an early supporter and founder for the effort behind the successful recall election of the San Francisco District Attorney Chesa Boudin in 2022.

== Publications ==
- Jason Calacanis, Angel: How to Invest in Technology Startups, Harper Business, 2017 ISBN 9780062560704
