= Chamath Palihapitiya =

Canadian-American businessman (born 1976)

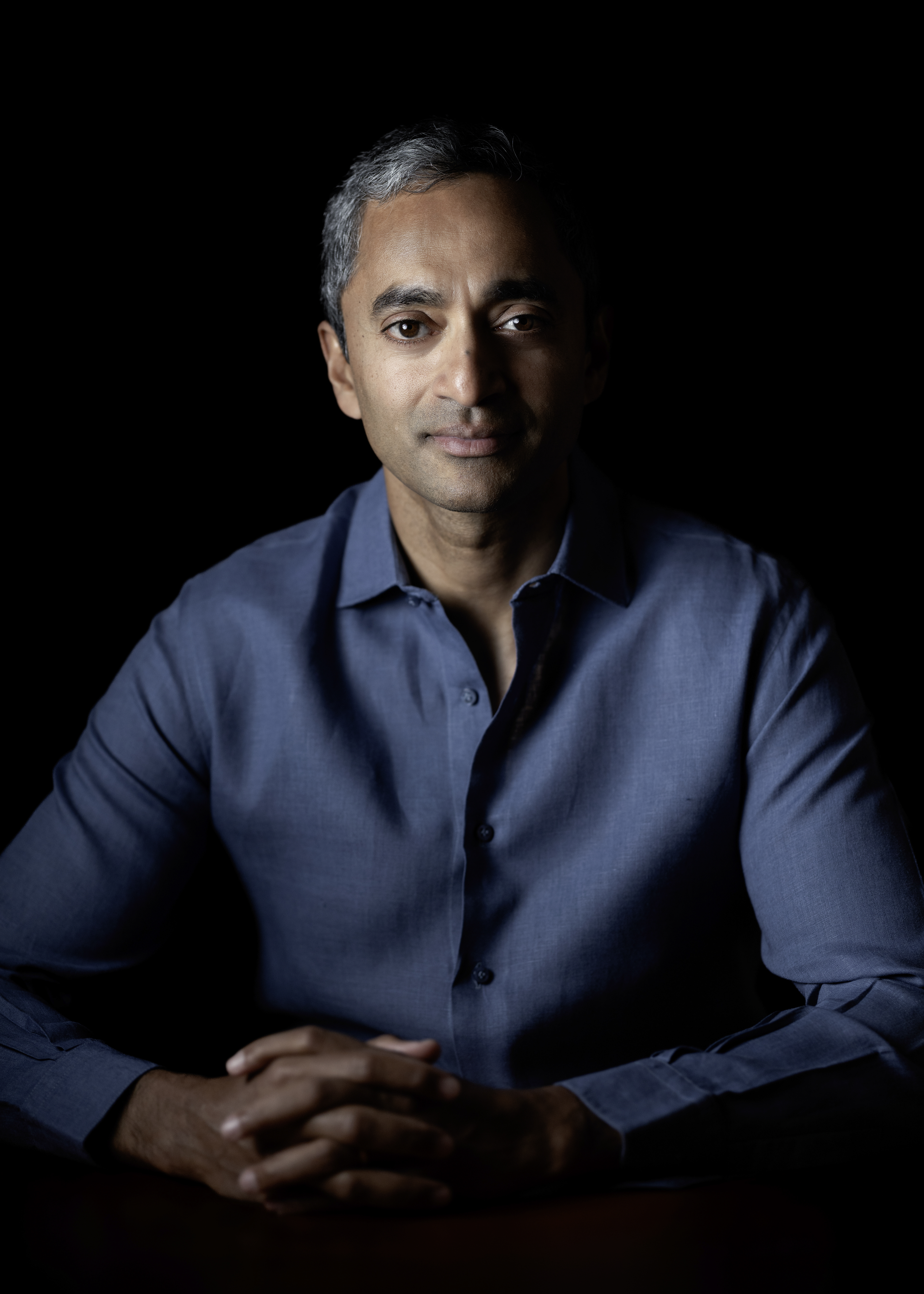
- Palihapitiya in 2025
- Born: 3 September 1976 (age 50); Galle, Sri Lanka
- Citizenship: Canada; United States
- Education: University of Waterloo (BASc)
- Occupations: Entrepreneur; businessman; venture capitalist
- Years active: 2007–present
- Spouses: Brigette Lau (div. 2018) Nathalie Dompé (m. 2023)
- Children: 5

Chamath Palihapitiya (born 3 September 1976) is a Sri Lankan-born Canadian venture capitalist and entrepreneur. He founded and leads Social Capital, which he launched in 2011 after serving as a senior executive at Facebook from 2007 to 2011.

Palihapitiya has used Social Capital to invest in technology and healthcare companies, championed high-profile special-purpose acquisition company deals, held a minority stake in the Golden State Warriors, and co-hosts All-In, a weekly business and technology podcast launched in 2021 with co-hosts Jason Calacanis, David Sacks, and David Friedberg, which focuses on startup investing and technology policy.

== Early life and education ==
Chamath Palihapitiya was born on 3 September 1976 in Galle, a city in south Sri Lanka to a Sinhalese family. At the age of 5 he moved to Canada, where his father joined the staff of the High Commission of Sri Lanka in Ottawa. When the posting ended in 1986 the family sought asylum in Canada because his father had criticized violence against Tamils during the Sri Lankan Civil War.

He grew up in a financially precarious household. His father struggled with alcoholism and unemployment, and his mother worked housekeeping jobs to support the family. Palihapitiya took a job at Burger King at age fourteen to help cover household expenses.

He attended the Lisgar Collegiate Institute, and graduated from the University of Waterloo in 1999 with a degree in electrical engineering.

== Early career ==
=== 1999–2007: Winamp and AOL ===
After graduation, Palihapitiya worked as derivatives trader at BMO Nesbitt Burns. In 2001, he moved to California to join Winamp. At AOL he became the company's youngest vice president and led its instant messaging division in 2004. He later spent a short period at Mayfield Fund before joining Facebook in 2007.

=== 2007–2011: Facebook ===
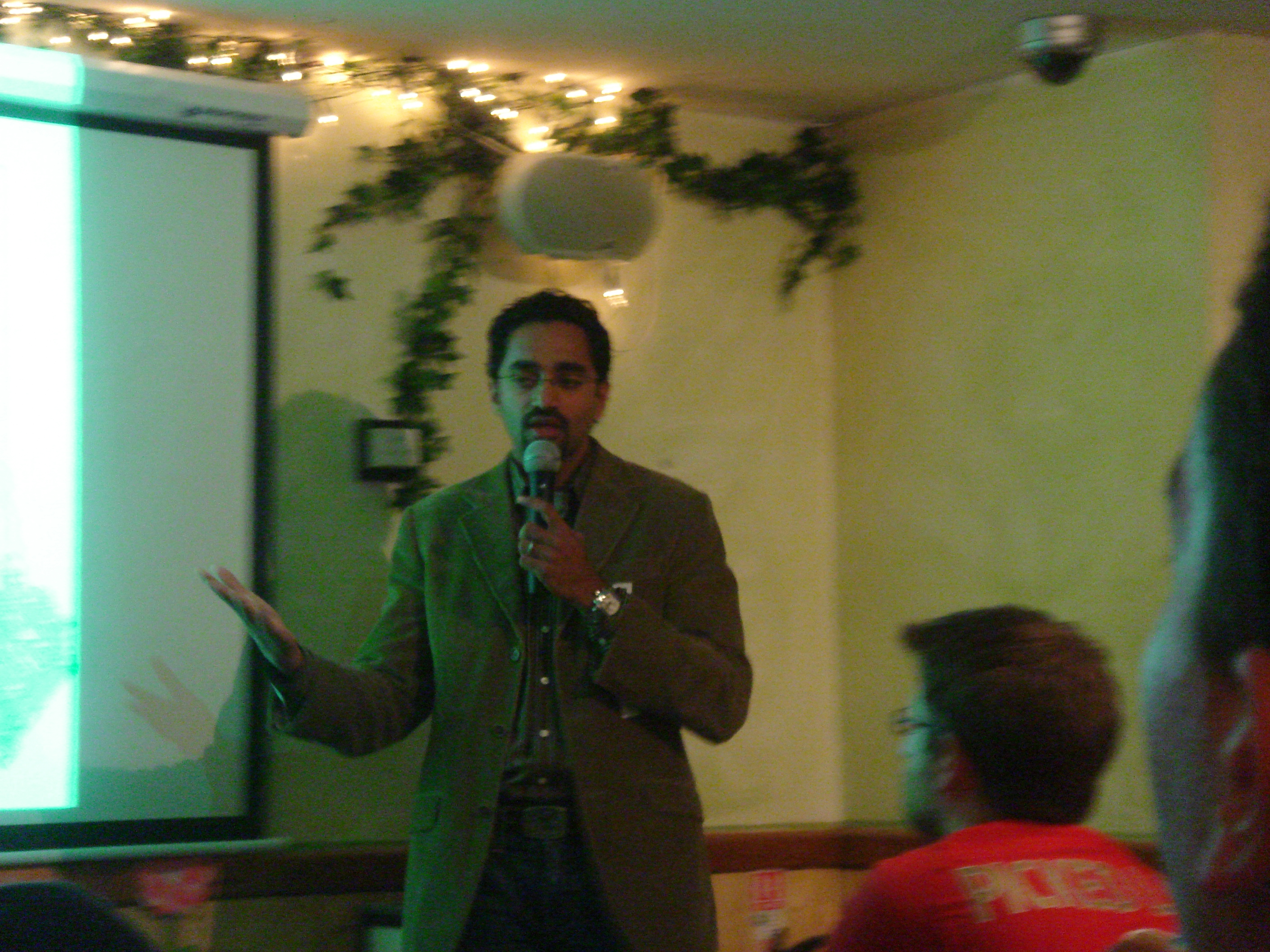
Palihapitiya in 2007 speaking at a Facebook event

At Facebook, Palihapitiya led the rollout of Facebook Beacon in 2007, an advertising system that tracked user purchases across third-party websites. The system faced privacy complaints and lawsuits, leading to discontinuation in 2009. Palihapitiya subsequently transitioned to lead Facebook's growth initiatives, a period during which the platform reached one billion users by 2012. He also led the Facebook Phone and Facebook Home initiatives before leaving the company in 2011.

In Facebook: The Inside Story, journalist Steven Levy documented accounts from former colleagues describing Palihapitiya's management style as aggressive. Some subordinates reported emotional distress working under his leadership.

== Investment career ==
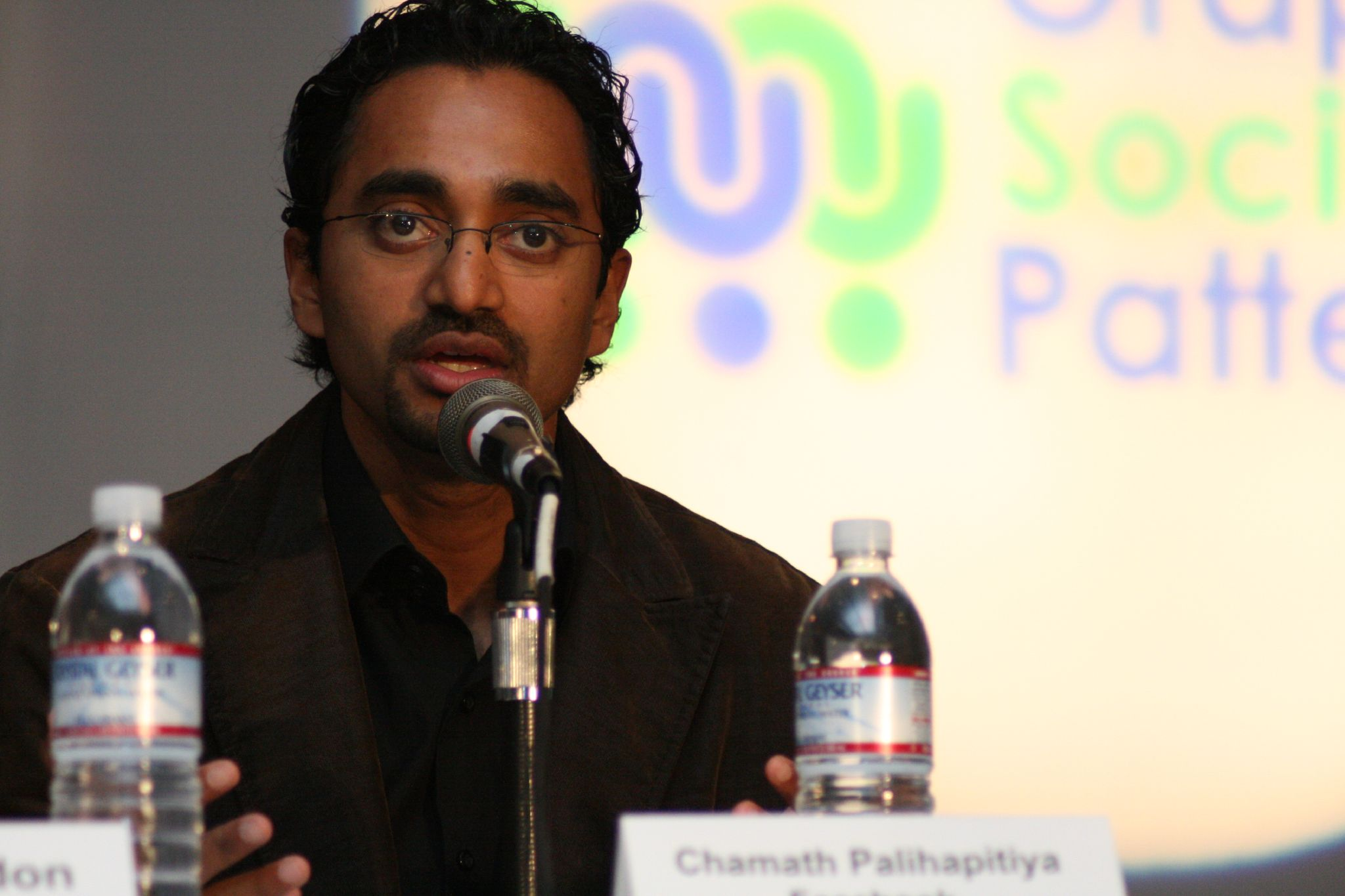
Palihapitiya speaking at Graphing Social Patterns conference in San Jose

Palihapitiya and his then-wife Brigette Lau founded Social Capital in 2011 after he left Facebook. The partnership invested in enterprise software and financial technology startups including Yammer, SecondMarket, Slack, Swarm, Groq, and Box. By 2015 Social Capital reported managing more than $1.1 billion in capital.

In 2018, Social Capital restructured from managing outside investor capital to a 'family office' focused on deploying Palihapitiya's personal wealth across diverse asset classes to include public equities, cryptocurrencies, biotech, space technology, climate solutions, and artificial intelligence.

In June 2025, Palihapitiya published his 2024 annual letter as CEO of Social Capital, which now manages $2.147 billion from $1.4 billion in paid-in capital. Reflecting on major economic and technological shifts, Palihapitiya warned that Chinese advances in large language models posed competitive threats to American technological leadership, characterizing the moment as America's 'Sputnik moment' requiring urgent government-industry cooperation. Chamath highlighted the Federal Reserve's diminishing influence over markets despite rate cuts, as long-term yields remained elevated due to concerns about U.S. fiscal policy and reduced demand for Treasury bonds. Palihapitiya emphasized 2024 as a pivotal year for AI, with venture investment reaching $150 billion and China achieving parity with the U.S. in foundational AI models. Palihapitiya characterized this as America's "Sputnik moment," warning that U.S. technological primacy could be at risk. Chamath also discussed the rise of new media and the creator economy, highlighting investments in companies like Groq (AI inference), Palmetto (clean energy), and Beast Industries (content creation).

=== 8090 venture ===
In January 2024, Palihapitiya announced a self-funded incubator called 8090 that promised to rebuild enterprise software with 80 percent of the original features for 90 percent less cost by combining artificial intelligence tooling with offshore engineering teams, pitching the effort as a way for customers to avoid high subscription fees. In July 2025, he promoted an 8090 Solutions product called the Software Factory, stating that alpha testing would begin in August ahead of a planned 1 September 2025 launch and framing it as a more reliable alternative to corporate AI proof-of-concept projects that he said had disappointed executives.

=== SPACs ===
Beginning in 2019, Palihapitiya sponsored a series of special purpose acquisition companies under the Social Capital Hedosophia brand. The New Yorker characterized Palihapitiya as promoting SPAC mergers with optimistic growth narratives. Critics argued his SPAC vehicles oversold return potential to retail investors, while supporters contended he was transparent about risks inherent in blank-check company structures. These vehicles sequentially completed mergers with Virgin Galactic (2019), Opendoor and Clover Health (2020), and SoFi (2021), taking these companies public.

The Social Capital Hedosophia-backed companies experienced substantial stock declines in 2021-2022. Virgin Galactic fell from $46 to $5; Clover Health from $28 to $4; Opendoor from $30 to $5; and SoFi from $25 to $3, underperforming both their initial projections and broader market benchmarks. This led to investor lawsuits and congressional scrutiny over misaligned incentives for retail shareholders. Congressional hearings examining SPAC structures, where sponsors benefit financially from transactions regardless of investor returns. Social Capital Hedosophia Holdings Corp. IV and VI ultimately redeemed their public shares and liquidated in September 2022 after failing to secure merger targets before their deadlines.

Palihapitiya's sponsored SPACs include:

SPAC name	Company taken public
Social Capital Hedosophia Holdings Corp. I (IPOA)	Virgin Galactic
Social Capital Hedosophia Holdings Corp. II (IPOB)	Opendoor
Social Capital Hedosophia Holdings Corp. III (IPOC)	Clover Health
Social Capital Hedosophia Holdings Corp. IV (IPOD)	Liquidated without merger
Social Capital Hedosophia Holdings Corp. V (IPOE)	SoFi
Social Capital Hedosophia Holdings Corp. VI (IPOF)	Liquidated without merger
American Exceptionalism Acquisition Corp. A (AEXA)	Currently seeking target

In September 2025 Palihapitiya launched American Exceptionalism Acquisition Corp. A, an NYSE-listed blank-check company that raised $345 million through a combination of its initial public offering and a private placement, with funds placed into a trust while it searches for a business combination. The venture stated it intends to pursue acquisitions in energy production, artificial intelligence, decentralized finance and defense industries.

== Political positions and activities ==
From approximately 2000 to 2019, Palihapitiya donated roughly $1.3 million to Democratic Party candidates and causes. Beginning in 2020-2021, his political contributions shifted substantially toward Republican Party candidates, including donations to Vivek Ramaswamy and a $12 million Trump fundraiser in 2024.

Palihapitiya with David Sacks, Mark Zuckerberg, and U.S. President Donald Trump at a White House dinner, September 4, 2025

In 2011, Palihapitiya donated $7,500 to U.S. Senate candidate Ted Cruz. In March 2020, Palihapitiya told The New York Times that he would like to see Michael Bloomberg at the top of the Democratic ticket in the 2020 Democratic Party presidential primaries, paired with Amy Klobuchar or Elizabeth Warren. In 2023, he hosted a $50,000-per-plate fundraiser for then-presidential candidate Vivek Ramaswamy, In 2024, he co-hosted a $12 million Trump fundraiser with his All-In podcast co-host David O. Sacks in San Francisco. He was a co-host, along with Jacqueline Sacks, David Sacks's wife, of the fundraising event, which raised $12 million and was held on 6 June 2024 at Sacks's Pacific Heights home.

=== Immigration reform and policy advocacy ===
Palihapitiya was listed as one of the "Founders" of the lobbying group FWD.us. The group launched on 11 April 2013, and its goals include immigration reform, improving education, and enabling technological innovation, all in a United States context. An article in The New Republic stated that Palihapitiya received a weekly report about FWD.us. When questioned about FWD.us lobbying strategy in The New Republic, Palihapitiya stated that the organization's leadership possessed sophistication in understanding political influence mechanisms.

=== San Francisco inequality and housing controversy ===
At Bloomberg's Next Big Thing conference in Sausalito, California, Palihapitiya made remarks critical of San Francisco's then mayor, Ed Lee, and proposed that San Francisco implement a tax on startup equity valuations to fund subsidized housing for low-income residents. He estimated the measure could generate resources for affordable housing amid rapid tech sector growth, though the proposal drew criticism from business interests regarding implementation feasibility. This led to a heated debate between Palihapitiya and super angel Ron Conway. Conway, a supporter of Lee, defended the city's policies, argued that things would get better for all residents, and noted that Palihapitiya lives in Palo Alto rather than in the city. In a later clarification to TechCrunch, Palihapitiya outlined his vision in more detail and described how his views on inequality and social mobility were shaped by his experience growing up with poor immigrant parents in Canada.

=== Social media ===
In 2017, Palihapitiya sparked discussion about social media's societal consequences, drawing from his experience at Facebook. He warned that social media platforms' engagement-maximization algorithms created psychological feedback loops that encouraged addictive usage patterns, potentially contributing to anxiety and depression. He specifically criticized features designed to maximize engagement metrics rather than user well-being. This perspective extends to his personal life, where he actively limits his children's screen time and social media exposure, emphasizing direct engagement over technological dependence.

=== California gubernatorial campaign ===
In January 2021 media outlets including Axios and Politico reported that Palihapitiya was exploring a campaign to replace California Governor Gavin Newsom if a recall election succeeded. On 25 January he stated that he would join the race and laid out a platform that included eliminating the state income tax, offering education vouchers, providing a two thousand dollar credit for every child born in California, and positioning the state as a hub for climate and technology jobs. He also shared a campaign website created by a supporter.

In February 2021, however, Palihapitiya declared he would not run for governor.

=== Comments on persecution of Uyghurs in China ===
In January 2022, Palihapitiya said on the All-In podcast to co-host Jason Calacanis that the persecution of Uyghurs in China does not concern him:

Nobody cares about what's happening to the Uyghurs, okay. You bring it up because you care and I think it's nice that you care. The rest of us don't care. I'm just telling you a very hard, ugly truth. Of all the things that I care about, yes, it is below my line.

Palihapitiya said he and most Americans care more about domestic economic issues than the human rights abuses of China's Uyghur minority. In response, the Golden State Warriors issued a statement saying that Palihapitiya "does not speak on behalf of our franchise, and his views certainly don't reflect those of our organization." In response to widespread criticism, Palihapitiya issued a statement clarifying that his remarks came across as insensitive and that he affirms belief in universal human rights. However, he did not retract his characterization of the Uyghur persecution issue as outside his personal areas of concern relative to domestic economic issues.

== Investments and philanthropy ==
In 2010, Palihapitiya became a minority investor in the Golden State Warriors with a 10% ownership stake. In June 2023, he divested completely from the team following public controversy over his comments regarding Uyghur persecution in China. Palihapitiya has donated consistently to his alma mater, the University of Waterloo. In 2018, he donated $25 million to the engineering department to support undergraduate scholarships and faculty research initiatives. In 2021, Palihapitiya pledged $7 million to deploy solar-powered atmospheric water generators (hydropanels) to provide clean drinking water infrastructure to 1,000 families in California's Central Valley.

== Personal life ==
After graduating from the University of Waterloo, Palihapitiya followed his future wife Brigette Lau to California. They married and had three children before divorcing in 2018.

Palihapitiya married Nathalie Dompé, an Italian business executive, in 2023. They have two children together.

Palihapitiya purchased a $75 million Bombardier Global 7500 in 2020.

== See also ==
- List of University of Waterloo people
