= David Friedberg =

American businessman (born 1980)

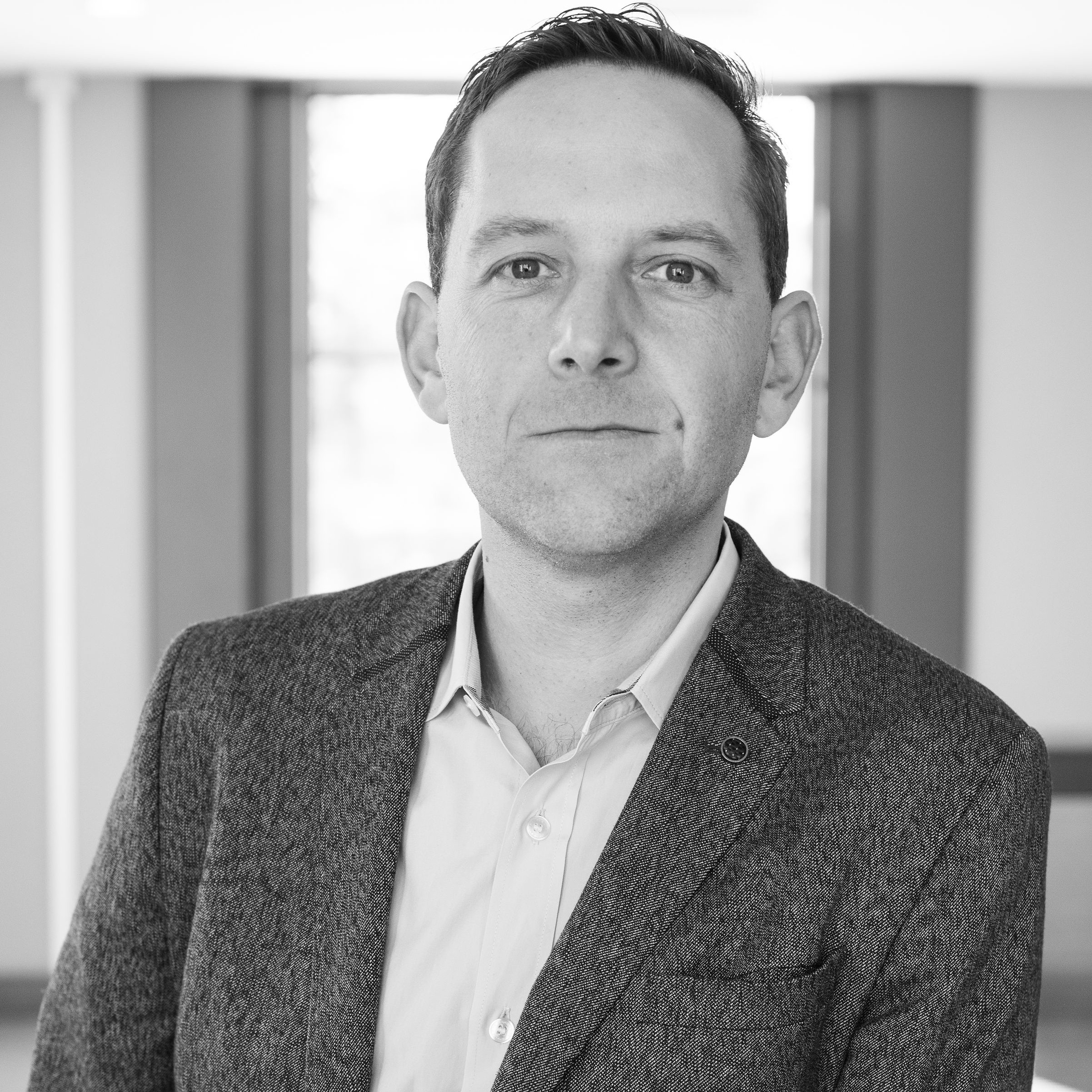
- Friedberg in 2020
- Born: June 6, 1980 (age 46); South Africa
- Citizenship: South Africa; United States
- Education: Clarkson University (attended); University of California, Berkeley (BS)

David Albert Friedberg (born June 6, 1980) is a South African-American entrepreneur, businessman, and angel investor. He founded The Climate Corporation and served as its chief executive, overseeing its $1.1 billion sale to Monsanto in 2013, the first unicorn transaction in the emerging agricultural technology sector. Friedberg later founded and leads The Production Board (TPB). He co-hosts the All-In podcast with David Sacks, Jason Calacanis, and Chamath Palihapitiya. Across his career he has contributed to 32 patents. He invests as an angel in technology, food, agriculture, and life sciences startups with 16 exits.

== Early life and education ==
Friedberg was born in South Africa. He moved with his family to Los Angeles, California, when he was six. In high school he led the environmental club "Students H.O.P.E." (Students Healing Our Planet Earth). At 16 he enrolled at Clarkson University in Potsdam, New York, worked in a pool hall, and learned to play poker. After a year in upstate New York he transferred to the University of California, Berkeley, where he held a part-time job doing mathematical modeling at the Lawrence Berkeley National Laboratory and earned a bachelor's degree in astrophysics in 2001.

== Career ==
=== Google ===
After several years in investment banking and private equity, Friedberg joined Google in March 2004 as one of the first 1,000 employees and a founding member of Google's Corporate Development group. As Corporate Development and Business Product Manager, Friedberg helped run Google's online advertising platform, AdWords, and negotiated acquisitions and worked with Google co-founder Larry Page.

=== The Climate Corporation ===
In 2006 he founded his first company, WeatherBill, to create and buy custom weather insurance online while still working at Google as a business product manager. He later recounted driving past the Bike Hut in San Francisco and watching sales slump on rainy days, which convinced him that weather created a major risk for small businesses.

WeatherBill secured funding from Founders Fund, Khosla Ventures, Google Ventures, New Enterprise Associates, Index Ventures and Atomico. In 2011 Friedberg renamed WeatherBill as The Climate Corporation. The Climate Corporation offered farmers weather insurance and the climate.com service to help them track, analyze, and make field-specific decisions to improve agricultural outcomes. On 5 October 2011 Friedberg delivered his Entrepreneurship Gives Life Meaning lecture at Stanford.

In October 2013, Monsanto announced that it was acquiring The Climate Corporation for about $1.1 billion. Friedberg joined Monsanto's Executive Team after the acquisition and in 2016 shifted to an advisory role.

=== Metromile and other roles ===
Friedberg founded the car insurance firm Metromile in 2011 and served as its chairman during its early years. In 2014 he purchased Canadian quinoa supplier NorQuin, then North America's largest producer. Above Food Corp. acquired NorQuin in 2022 and appointed Friedberg to its Innovation Advisory Council.

Friedberg is a supporter of Donald Trump. In July 2025, the All-In Podcast did an interview with Treasury Secretary Scott Bessent at the White House, which Friedberg described as "one of the best days of my life." In 2026, Friedberg was appointed to the President's Council of Advisors on Science and Technology (PCAST) by President Donald Trump.

=== The Production Board ===
In 2016 Friedberg began speaking with Larry Page about building and financing startups focused on food, agriculture, decarbonization, and life sciences. Through Alphabet Page agreed to finance a holding company that Friedberg would operate. Friedberg founded The Production Board (TPB) later that year.

TPB partners with scientists, business leaders, and entrepreneurs to address challenges such as climate change. Its portfolio includes Pattern Ag, Ohalo, Culture Biosciences, Triplebar Bio, Supergut, and Cana. In July 2021, Friedberg announced that The Production Board raised $300 million from Alphabet, Baillie Gifford, Allen & Co., BlackRock, Koch Disruptive Technologies and Morgan Stanley's Counterpoint Global.

==== Ohalo ====
Ohalo Genetics, a plant breeding company incubated by The Production Board in 2019, develops breeding systems and new crop varieties intended to raise yields while using fewer natural resources. In November 2023 Friedberg became the company's full-time chief executive after helping found the venture.

Under Friedberg Ohalo promotes a platform it calls "Boosted Breeding", which uses gene editing and quantitative genomics to control inheritance during reproduction. The firm states that the approach can produce polyploid offspring that retain the full genomes of both parents and can shorten breeding cycles across major crops. In 2024 AgFunderNews reported that Ohalo had raised a little over $100 million, was developing programs in crops including potato, and planned to partner with seed companies on additional crops.

== Personal life ==
Friedberg co-hosts the All-In business and investment podcast with Chamath Palihapitiya, David O. Sacks, and Jason Calacanis.

Friedberg is a lifelong vegetarian.
