= Clover Health =

U.S. healthcare company

Clover Health Investments, Corp.
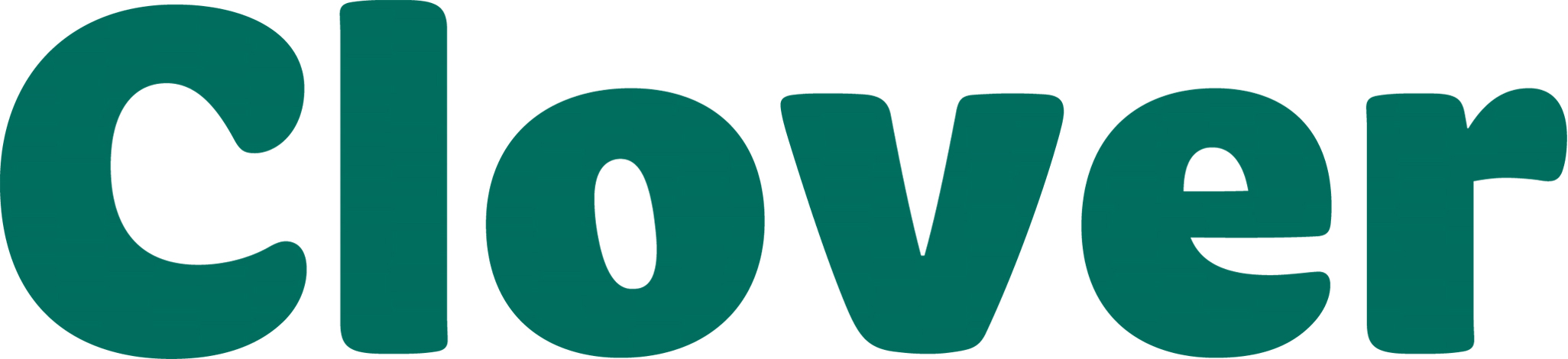
- Type: Public
- Traded as: Nasdaq: CLOV (Class A)
- Industry: Health care
- Founded: 2014; 12 years ago, in San Francisco, United States
- Headquarters: Franklin, Tennessee, United States
- Area served: Arizona, Georgia, Kansas, New Jersey, New York, Pennsylvania, Rhode Island, South Carolina, Tennessee, Texas, Vermont
- Key people: Andrew Toy (CEO); Vivek Garipalli (executive chairperson); Conrad Wai (CTO)
- Revenue: ▲US$1.92 billion (2025)
- Net income: ▼ −US$85.5 million (2025)
- Total assets: ▼US$541 million (2025)
- Total equity: ▼US$309 million (2025)
- Number of employees: 458 (2021)
- Website: cloverhealth.com

Clover Health Investments, Corp. is an American health care company founded in 2014. The company provides Medicare Advantage (MA) insurance plans and operates as a direct contracting entity with the U.S. government. The company manages care for Medicare beneficiaries in 11 states and started trading publicly on January 8, 2021.

== History ==
Vivek Garipalli and Kris Gale co-founded Clover Health in 2014. Garipalli previously founded and operated a chain of hospitals in New Jersey called CarePoint Health.

More than 7,200 people were insured by Clover Health by 2015 and the company had more than 39,000 members by 2019, reporting revenues of $427.4 million and a net loss of $60.57 million.

In 2016, the company was fined $106,095 for misleading its members about where they could receive care. According to Bloomberg, Clover Health paid the fine and updated its marketing materials.

Gale left the company in 2017. Clover Health launched a home-based primary care program for homebound members in 2017 and partnered with Spiras Health and Upward Health in 2021 to expand the program, designed to reduce costs and hospitalizations.

In 2018, Clover Health partnered with MindMate, an app developer that makes games designed to maintain or improve cognitive function in older adults.

In 2019, Clover Health launched Clover Therapeutics, a biopharmaceutical company that uses data collected from Clover's plan members to research and develop therapies for chronic diseases related to age. The company partnered with Genentech to study the relationship between genetics and the risk of ocular disease. In March 2019, the company said it needed to shift its focus to health care industry experience and reduced its staff by approximately 20 percent.

In February 2021, the short seller Hindenburg Research released a report alleging Clover Health was under investigation by the Department of Justice, and that it had failed to disclose the investigation to investors before going public. Share prices fell by twelve percent following the release of the report. The company responded to the report and said it did not need to disclose the inquiry because it was determined to be immaterial in filings with the Securities and Exchange Commission by lawyers of Clover Health, the initial public offering underwriters, and third-party attorneys. Following the report, the SEC opened an investigation into Clover Health. In April, Clover Health began working as a direct contracting entity with CMS, which allows the company to negotiate contracts with doctors treating patients using fee-for-service Medicare options. About half of the company's total beneficiaries were added through this contracting service. In June, Clover Health became the target of traders as a “meme stock”, causing share prices to fluctuate. Share prices rose 20% in one day after the company cautioned investors against purchasing shares due to being part of a short squeeze on hype from Reddit retail investors.

In 2023, Andrew Toy became CEO after Vivek Garipalli transitioned out of the role at the end of 2022. Garipalli stayed on with the company as its executive chairperson.

=== Funding and IPO ===
From 2015 to 2017, Clover Health ran a series of venture capital funding rounds, receiving funding from First Round Capital, Sequoia Capital, and Greenoaks Capital. A Series D funding round in 2017 included support from Alphabet Inc's investment company GV and led to Clover Health being valued at more than $1.2 billion and achieving “unicorn” status.

In October 2020, the company announced that it had reached a $3.7 billion deal with Chamath Palihapitiya and would go public through a merger with a special-purpose acquisition company. Clover Health began trading on the NASDAQ under the ticker CLOV on January 8, 2021. The company ended its first day on the public market with a value of about $7 billion.

=== Short seller report and "meme stock" status ===
Less than a month after it began trading, Clover Health was the subject of a "blistering" short seller report by research firm Hindenburg Research that drove its stock down by 15%. Responding the following day, the company disclosed it was under investigation by the U.S. Securities and Exchange Commission. Later in 2021, attracted by the significant short interest, Clover Health became a meme stock and its stock price rose significantly; before falling back; as of June 2022 the share price remains significantly below where it went public.

== Services ==
Clover Health offers Medicare Advantage plans in "largely rural or underserved areas". The company is led by chief executive officer Andrew Toy. As of August 2021, Clover Health had 129,000 beneficiaries, split between its Medicare Advantage plans and direct contracting coverage. The beneficiaries are located in 11 states: Arizona, Georgia, Kansas, New Jersey, New York, Pennsylvania, Rhode Island, South Carolina, Tennessee, Texas, and Vermont.

Clover Health created a machine learning software platform called the Clover Assistant to offer care recommendations to primary care physicians and alert them about medical events, such as if a patient has picked up their prescription. The platform aggregates health information and uses it with the machine learning process to deliver recommendations to care providers.

== Operations ==
The corporate headquarters are in Franklin, Tennessee, and the company has additional offices in San Francisco, California, Jersey City, New Jersey, and Hong Kong.

Chelsea Clinton and Demetrios L. Kouzoukas, the former Director of the Center for Medicare and Principal Deputy Administrator of the Center for Medicare and Medicaid Services (CMS) during the Trump administration, are both members of Clover Health's board of directors.
