= Keiretsu Forum =

Private forum of international members comprising an angel investment network

- Formation: 2000; 26 years ago
- Founder: Randy Williams
- Headquarters: San Francisco, California
- Region served: Cities in America, Asia and Europe
- Members: 53 Chapters
- Website: www.keiretsuforum.com

Keiretsu Forum is a private group of international members comprising an angel investor network. The network has 53 chapters in cities in three continents, these include San Francisco, Seattle, New York City, Paris France, Istanbul Turkey, and Chennai in India. The network was founded in 2000 by Randy Williams in San Francisco.

== History ==
In 2008, Williams started the Keiretsu Forum Investor Capital Expo, which brings together angel investors and entrepreneurs looking for funding. It started in Silicon Valley/San Francisco for the Northern California Investor Capital Expo and was held each year. Investor Capital Expos have been hosted in cities including: Stockholm, Seattle, Sydney, Toronto, Prague, Chicago, and Philadelphia.

== Referral Fees Controversy ==
Keiretsu Forum operates using a referral model that charges entrepreneurs and startups significant fees for the opportunity to pitch to the network members, a practice that is strongly discouraged in Angel Capital Association guidelines. In 2009, tech investor and author Jason Calacanis criticized several investor networks, including Keiretsu, as operating pay to play schemes.

He also established Open Angel Forum as an alternative investor network that doesn't charge fees. Williams subsequently clarified Keiretsu's policy of waiving fees for startup companies that have limited capital and no revenue.
