= The Climate Corporation =

American digital agriculture services company

- Industry: Agriculture
- Founded: 2006; 20 years ago
- Founder: David Friedberg, Siraj Khaliq
- Fate: subsidiary of Bayer
- Headquarters: San Francisco, CA, USA
- Key people: Mike Stern: CEO
- Parent: Bayer
- Website: climate.com

The Climate Corporation was a digital agriculture company that examines weather, soil and field data to help farmers determine potential yield-limiting factors in their fields.

== History ==
The company was founded as WeatherBill in 2006 by two former Google employees, David Friedberg and Siraj Khaliq.

The company began as a startup focused on helping people and businesses manage and adapt to climate change, by providing weather insurance to ski resorts, large event venues, and farmers. In 2010, it decided to focus exclusively on agriculture, and launched the Total Weather Insurance Product in fall 2010 for corn and soybeans.

On October 11, 2011, WeatherBill changed its name to The Climate Corporation.

In June 2013, the U.S. Department of Agriculture's Risk Management Agency authorized the Climate Corporation to administer federal crop insurance policies for the 2014 crop year.

In October 2013, Monsanto acquired the company for approximately $1.1 billion.

In February 2014, the company announced it merged with Monsanto's Integrated Farming System and Precision Planting divisions. In February 2014, the company also acquired Solum, a soil testing company based in Ames, Iowa.

In December 2014, the company acquired 640 Labs, an agricultural technology startup based in Chicago. 640 Labs created the Drive device (later renamed the Fieldview Drive) that reads data from the CANBUS of tractors and connects to an iPad or iPhone.

In July 2015, the company sold its crop insurance business to AmTrust Financial Services, enabling The Climate Corporation to focus exclusively on its digital agriculture platform. Details of the agreement were not disclosed.

In May 2017, the agreement to sell Precision Planting LLC to John Deere was terminated. In August 2016, the U.S. Department of Justice had filed a lawsuit to block the sale, arguing the deal could make it more expensive for farmers to use fast, precise planting technology. Precision Planting CEO Michael Stern stated: "We just didn't see that there was a clear path going forward, that the DOJ was going to approve the transaction. We have a valuable business and people in limbo and it was just time to move on."

In June 2018, Bayer acquired Monsanto and Precision Planting with it.
