= Weblogs, Inc. =

Defunct blog

- Industry: Internet
- Founded: September 2003; 23 years ago
- Founders: Brian Alvey; Jason Calacanis
- Defunct: 2011; 15 years ago
- Successor: AOL
- Products: Blogs
- Parent: Independent (2003–2005); (AOL) Time Warner (2005–2009); AOL (2009–2011)

Weblogs, Inc. was a blog network that published content on a variety of subjects, including tech news, video games, automobiles, and pop culture. At one point, the network had as many as 90 blogs, although the vast majority of its traffic could be attributed to a smaller number of breakout titles, as was typical of most large-scale successful blog networks of the mid-2000s. Popular blogs included Engadget, Autoblog, TUAW, Joystiq, Luxist, Slashfood, Cinematical, TV Squad, Download Squad, Blogging Baby, Gadling, AdJab, and Blogging Stocks.

Today, Engadget and Autoblog are the only remaining brands from the company.

== History ==
The company was founded in September 2003 by Jason Calacanis and Brian Alvey, in the wake of Calacanis's Silicon Alley Reporter magazine, with backing from investor Mark Cuban. By early 2004, Weblogs, Inc. and Gawker Media were establishing the two most notable templates for networked blog empires. Initially, Weblogs, Inc. consisted of a few dozen blogs, all residing as subdomains of weblogsinc.com. The exception was Engadget, a stand-alone site covering new technology in blog format. Engadget was co-founded by Peter Rojas, the former editor of Gizmodo in the Gawker Media network. Eventually a plethora of independent brands were established, including 26 stand-alone sites and over 50 sub-blogs. A few of the company principals also maintained personal blogs on the network, including Mark Cuban.

Weblogs Inc was sold to AOL for a reported $25 million in October 2005. The move came as AOL was preparing to become an independent division within Time Warner. Weblogs Inc continued to operate independently from AOL's other content websites for many years, until AOL began phasing out the Weblogs Inc branding in favor of its own, consolidating to a few of the strongest titles, and integrating more closely with its namesake media division, which included AOL News, AOL Autos, AOL Tech, etc.

The emphasis on AOL branding was increased following the spin-off of AOL from Time Warner in 2009. Up until mid-2010, Weblogs, Inc. branding remained subtly alongside AOL's, on titles like Engadget and Autoblog, but in late 2010, the name was dropped and the official website was redirected to AOL.com, approximately coinciding with a major redesign of AOL branded properties. Around the same time, AOL also acquired tech industry blog TechCrunch, at a time when it had less than a dozen remaining blog brands.

Following AOL's $315 million acquisition of The Huffington Post in February 2011, the former Weblogs Inc blogs, along with TechCrunch and many of AOL's other content brands, were reorganized under a new division called the "Huffington Post Media Group." Under the arrangement, the Huffington Post editorial team took responsibility for editorial oversight of AOL's other blogs and news sites. Months after the acquisition, AOL further consolidated its total count of content websites to just 20 brands, of which Engadget, Autoblog, Joystiq, and TUAW were the only remaining former Weblogs, Inc. titles.

The Huffington Post Media Group branding was never used in any significant public-facing capacity, but the Huffington editorial team was put firmly in control of AOL's news websites. This led to numerous controversies over editorial direction, including the departure of TechCrunch editor and founder Michael Arrington.

Joystiq and TUAW were shut down and folded into Engadget in February 2015. Around the same time, AOL Autos and AOL Tech were shut down and redirected to Autoblog and Engadget, respectively.

In 2015, AOL was acquired by Verizon. In 2017, AOL's content business, along with that of Yahoo!, which was also acquired by Verizon, were combined into a new online media subsidiary. Then Verizon sold that to private equity firm Apollo Global Management.

Currently, Engadget and Autoblog are the only remaining former Weblogs Inc. titles.

== Blogs ==
=== Engadget ===
Launched in March 2004, Engadget is updated multiple times a day with articles on gadgets and consumer electronics. Engadget is a webzine that looks like a blog.

=== Autoblog ===
Launched in June 2004, Autoblog is an automotive news and car shopping website formerly based in Birmingham, Michigan. A winner of a 2014 Webby Award for its original video series The List, Autoblog produced daily articles and videos covering all facets of the auto industry, as well as a weekly video podcast featuring the editors of the site. Autoblog was also home to vehicle shopping tools and research pages where users could search for new and used vehicles for purchase. Autoblog's final Editor-in-Chief was Greg Migliore and its last General Manager is Adam Morath. In September 2024, staff were let go and the website was purchased by The Arena Group, who hired an all-new group of writers.

=== Joystiq ===
Joystiq was a weblog covering video games and video game culture. It was shut down on February 3, 2015.

=== Hack a Day ===
Founded in September 2004, Hack a Day (also known as HackADay) is a weblog covering hacks, mods, and projects popular among computer enthusiasts. It was not included in the sale of Weblogs, Inc. to AOL, but remained a separate entity until it was sold to SupplyFrame in 2013.

=== TV Squad ===
TV Squad was a television weblog founded on March 10, 2005. By 2006, it was one of the most popular on the Internet. TV Squad was originally conceptualized to allow any Weblogs, Inc. blogger to write about the television shows they watch. Eventually, a core group of bloggers for the site was realized, with several other Weblogs, Inc. bloggers contributing on an irregular basis. TV Squad had about 20 regularly contributing bloggers. Writers include Adam Finley, Keith McDuffee, Bob Sassone, Jane Boursaw, Jay Black, Wil Wheaton, and Paul Goebel, and the site's main television critic is former Chicago Tribune critic Maureen Ryan, who came to the site in 2010. During the 2007–2008 Writers Guild of America strike, while some industry blogs stopped or wrote articles in support of the strike, TV Squad continued to publish material normally.

TV Squad operated as a separate, independent site until May 2011, when AOL merged TV Squad with AOL. This meant all of the old TV Squad content would then be found on AOL TV. Originally, TVSquad.com was automatically redirected to AOLTV.com. Just seven months later, AOLTV became HuffPost TV, moving the content once again.

=== The Unofficial Apple Weblog (TUAW) ===
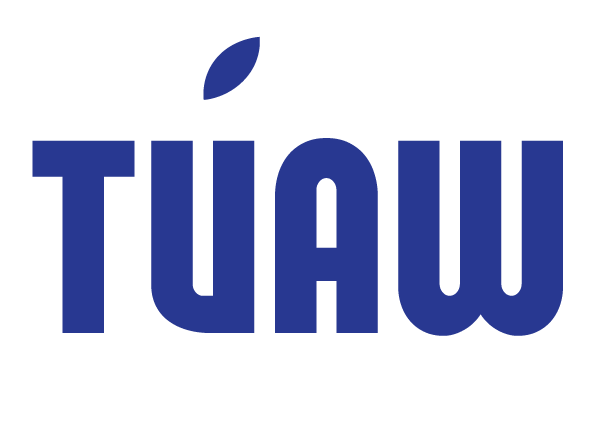

TUAW covered tips, reviews, news, analyses, and opinions on Apple Inc.'s products. Founded in 2004 and one of the most successful blogs from Weblogs, Inc., TUAW was shut down February 3, 2015, and its archives republished on Engadget. The blog was revived in mid 2024, publishing AI-generated articles. Many are AI-generated summaries of old posts from the original staff, often incorrectly attributing the wrong author and including AI-generated images of people alongside their bylines. According to TUAW's website, the brand was acquired by Web Orange Limited in 2024, "without its original content". Web Orange Limited says on its website to be a Hong Kong–based "advertising services" company.

=== Download Squad ===
Download Squad was a popular blog following web-based and downloadable software and news for desktop and mobile platforms. Consistently cited among popular software blogs, it was named among Computerworld's list of the ten best-written blogs on the Internet in 2008. Download Squad, along with sister blog Switched, was shut down on April 12, 2011, by parent company AOL.
