= Touchstone Partners =

Indian corporate law firm

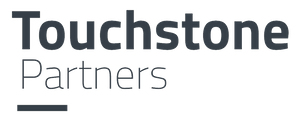
- Headquarters: Mumbai
- Offices: Mumbai, New Delhi, Bangalore
- Major practice areas: Corporate law
- Date founded: 2002
- Founder: Karam Daulet-Singh
- Website: https://touchstonepartners.com/

Touchstone Partners is an Indian corporate law firm headquartered in Mumbai.

== History ==
Touchstone Partners was established as Daulet-Singh & Associates in 2002 in New Delhi. In 2008, it opened an office in Mumbai and rebranded as Platinum Partners. It opened an office in Bengaluru in 2015. Following a split in late 2020, the New Delhi and Bengaluru offices formed Touchstone Partners and the then Mumbai office rebranded to Quillon Partners. Touchstone Partners subsequently opened a new office in Mumbai moved their headquarters there in 2022.

== Rankings ==
The firm is ranked Band 2 for Corporate M&A by Chambers and Partners, Band 3 for Competition / Antitrust by Chambers and Partners, and Band 3 for International & Cross-Border Capabilities by Chambers and Partners
