= Visegrád 24 =

Polish X (formerly Twitter) current events account

- Website type: Online newspaper
- Available in: English
- Owner: Intermarium Foundation
- Founders: Adam Starzyński; Stefan Tompson
- Website: www.visegrad24.com
- Current status: Active

Visegrád 24 is an account on X (formerly Twitter) and website that publishes opinions, fake news, and often unverified information related to current events, including the Russian invasion of Ukraine and the Gaza war. One of its founders is South-African Polish content creator and advertiser Stefan Tompson. It has close ties to the Law and Justice party, as well as to other conservative parties in the Visegrád Group countries.

== History ==
=== Early history ===
Visegrád 24 was founded in January 2020. According to a 2022 analysis by Polish investigative outlet OKO.press, it was started by an anonymous Polish group; they claimed: "We are just a group of friends who are interested in the Visegrad Group and the 3SI. Most of us work in news in our own countries, most are conservative, although we have different opinions." According to the analysis, the profile was at that time an unofficial profile of the Visegrád Group. It had primarily been promoting Prime Minister of Hungary Viktor Orbán and other right-wing politicians in the group, was sympathetic to United States president Donald Trump, and contained negative content about Western European political leaders.

=== Ukraine, Israel pivot ===
Amid the Russian invasion of Ukraine, Visegrád 24 grew in popularity, which resulted with Visegrád 24 being referenced by both Polish and international media, including CNBC, the Daily Express, Euractiv and The Times of Israel. In March 2022, researchers from the Faculty of Social Sciences of the University of Tartu listed Visegrád 24 in their list of reliable sources of information related to the war in Ukraine.

Research conducted by the University of Washington's Center for an Informed Public in October 2023 found that Visegrád 24 was one of the seven most influential Twitter accounts with regard to news coverage of the Gaza war. The researchers described the accounts as "new elites" due to exercising "disproportionate power and influence" over coverage of the war.

As of July 2024, Visegrád 24 has over one million followers.

== Misinformation ==
In 2022 and 2023, Polish media outlet OKO.press and Visegrad Insight published, respectively, that Visegrád 24 was a propaganda and misinformation hub funded by the Polish government. The left-leaning Israeli newspaper TheMarker wrote in December 2023 that Visegrád 24 "spreads a blatant pro-Israel and pro-Ukraine narrative, including through fake news" from "a pair of Polish right-wing extremists who take an Islamophobic and xenophobic line".

=== Russian invasion of Ukraine ===
In March 2022, Visegrád 24 posted an unsourced tweet falsely claiming that Leonardo DiCaprio had donated $10 million to Ukraine. The false story was picked up by news outlets around the world, such as India's Hindustan Times, the U.K.'s The Independent and the Daily Mail, and American conservative websites The Daily Caller and the Washington Examiner, before being retracted. Visegrád 24 also posted a fake story claiming that Pornhub had blocked access from Russia.

In October 2022, Visegrád 24 posted a video claimed to show a recently mobilized Russian soldier. Reuters found that the video dated back to at least February 2021.

In May 2023, Visegrád 24 shared footage of a fire in Krasnohvardiiske, falsely claiming that it showed a crashed helicopter in Belgorod. That July, it misrepresented footage of Wigan Athletic football fans as showing Ukrainians celebrating the country's attack on the Kerch bridge.

=== Publication of Sanna Marin speech ===
Visegrád 24 was the first foreign social media account to publish a video of Finnish Prime Minister Sanna Marin's "party speech" in August 2022. The OKO Press article, which investigated the activities of Visegrád 24, considered the role of the first publisher of Visegrád 24 at a time when Marin was the prime minister during Finland's NATO membership application. OKO Press' article described the publication of the video as indicative of the typical modus operandi of the Russian intelligence service. The video received about 10 million views on Visegrád 24's account.

=== Israel–Gaza war ===
The University of Washington's Center for an Informed Public stated in an October 2023 report that Visegrád 24 was primarily posting emotionally-charged content, with some posts using divisive imagery and "culture war" framing. They noted, "While traditional news does at times use such imagery as well, the sheer volume of these tweets, combined with the lack of deeper analysis or context mentioned above, created for our analysts the sense of a constant stream of decontextualized anger and violence when analyzing these accounts." Visegrád 24 has described environmental activist Greta Thunberg as a "Hamas propagandist", portrayed Israeli comedian Yoni Sharon as a Palestinian and misrepresented footage by Palestinian journalist Motaz Azaiza to depict Israeli activities in a positive light.

In October 2023, Visegrád 24 posted a video that it claimed to show a pro-Hamas demonstration in Barcelona, Spain. Snopes found that the video showed authentic footage of a pro-Palestinian demonstration, but none of the demonstrators had openly expressed support for Hamas. Visegrád 24 also posted a CNN clip that claimed babies had been decapitated by Hamas during their initial attack on Israel. CNN later issued two corrections; the Center for an Informed Public noted they could not find any corrections by Visegrád 24 about the rumour.

In November 2023, Bloomberg News found that Visegrád 24 was one of the influencers that went viral by posting misinformation since the start of the war, citing an instance where Visegrád 24 claimed without evidence that the Taliban had asked the Iranian, Iraqi and Jordanian governments for passage to join with Hamas.

In December 2023, Visegrád 24 posted a video clip on X from 2015 of a man who shouted at Israeli soldiers before falling. In the post, Visegrád 24 posed the question, "What is going on here? Is Pallyywood [sic] in action?", in reference to Pallywood, a derogatory term used to describe alleged staged suffering by Palestinians.

By late 2025, Visegrád 24 launched a new website and social media account titled Middle East 24, taking over some of its Israel-Gaza coverage and using similar tactics. Notably, all stories are published anonymously, with only a generic username as the byline, and at least one title was inadvertently revealed to be AI-generated to boost SEO.

=== Other ===
In February 2024, Visegrád 24 posted a video of a controlled demolition in Turkey that it claimed to show a mosque being demolished in China. It deleted the tweet after other users pointed out the video was not from China.

== Founders ==
Polish journalist Adam Starzyński and content creator and advertiser Stefan Tompson were identified by OKO.press as being behind Visegrád 24. On 2 March 2024, Visegrád 24 tweeted that Stefan Tompson was the founder. The Jewish Chronicle also cites Tompson as the founder. The OKO.press investigation also listed Wojciech Pawelczyk, a collaborator of Polish-American alt-right commentator and conspiracy theorist Jack Posobiec.

=== Adam Starzyński ===
Polish journalist Adam Starzyński has worked for the English service of the right-wing Polish television channel Telewizja Republika. Starzyński is also known to have run a very conservative Twitter account, BasedPoland, which had 150,000 followers before Twitter deleted the account. Starzyński is a key figure in the MEGA movement (Make Europe Great Again), an informal movement similar to Donald Trump's Make America Great Again campaign that seeks to spread xenophobia and populist views. The BasedPoland account was known for its anti-refugee content and praise of far-right political leaders, including the Polish government, Jair Bolsonaro, Matteo Salvini, and Viktor Orbán. Starzyński supports Ukraine and the European far-right on social media under the name Adam Starski. Starzyński has worked for the State of Poland Foundation since March 2020.

=== Stefan Tompson ===
Tompson (born 1993 or 1994) is a British communications manager of Polish and South African descent. He grew up in London and Paris in a family of Polish émigrés. He studied at the French Lycée in South Kensington, later transferring to Richmond Upon Thames College in Twickenham. He graduated from University College London in 2014.

Tompson has been working in Poland since 2014 and has been running an English-language YouTube channel about Polish history since 2020. He has received funding from the Polish Film Foundation and his videos have been published on the Visegrád 24 account. In an interview with Rzeczpospolita in September 2022, Tompson said that he created the Visegrád 24 accounts and maintains them together with his friends who work in the social media industry. He denied the claim that the video featuring Marin was the first to be published on Visegrád 24. He also considered the Prime Minister's celebration at a time of geopolitical tension questionable and stated that he believed that many supported Finland's NATO membership application only because “Sanna Marin is a beautiful woman”. According to Tompson, liberal views are overrepresented on social media compared to conservative views. He condemned Viktor Orbán's pro-Russian views on the war in Ukraine, but stressed that Orbán's view of the West's identity crisis is correct and that spreading that view was not in the interests of Russia. Tompson works for the Polish public broadcaster Telewizja Polska.

In 2024, Tompson told The Jewish Chronicle that his support of Israel "is not an act of altruism, it is an act of self-interest" and that Israel "is at the frontline of the battlefield of radical leftists in Western democracies who have, for some reason, joined forces with the Russia-China-Iran bloc". He also stated, "Anyone who says it is an apartheid state in Israel and the Palestinian people are subjugated should go to Ramallah. There were Maseratis and Mercedes and a brand-new shopping mall. There is a booming upper middle class."

Tompson told Jewish Insider that he considers himself to be a public relations expert rather than a journalist.

Tompson is also associated with the MEGA ("Make Europe Great Again") pro-Trump group. He has met with Matthew Tyrmand, an American conservative commentator and former member of the far-right activist group Project Veritas, as well as alt-right commentator and conspiracy theorist Jack Posobiec.

== Relationship with Polish government and right-wing elements ==
Visegrád 24's Twitter account was brought up by Polish right-wing conservative politicians before it became popular. According to the report by OKO Press, Visegrád 24 has close relations with the Polish foreign administration.

Polish Deputy Foreign Minister Szymon Szynkowski vel Sęk said in 2021 that Visegrád 24 is not the official account of the Visegrád Group or the Polish Presidency of the Visegrád Group, but that the Polish administration appreciates the work it does to inform the activities of the Visegrád Group. Polish diplomats and the English account of the Polish Prime Minister's Office have frequently mentioned and tagged the Visegrád 24 account in their posts, especially during the 2020–2021 Polish Presidency of the Visegrád Group. Visegrád 24 was popular with Polish right-wing politicians even before it established its position and became popular with the Ukrainian war. Hungarian ambassador Eduard Habsburg also tagged Visegrád 24 in his publications in 2021. Most often Visegrád 24 was tagged in his publications by Beata Daszyńska-Muzyczka, head of the Polish State National Development Bank, at a time when the bank was establishing the Three Seas Initiative Investment Fund. Daszyńska-Muzyczka is the chairman of the fund's supervisory board, a member of the Polish Foreign Affairs Research Unit and a board member of the State of Poland Foundation. The Polish Ministry of Foreign Affairs has denied any connection to Visegrád 24.

== Funding ==
Stefan Tompson, one of the founders and administrators of Visegrád 24, said in September 2022 that Visegrád 24 had been operating without any funding, but that it was going to look for investors to function properly as a news service.

On 31 October 2022, the Chancellery of the Polish Prime Minister awarded 1.4 million złoty (€300K) to the leisure and health promotion foundation Actionlife for a project called Visegrád 24. The decision was signed by Prime Minister Mateusz Morawiecki. The Polish news service Wirtualna Polska asked the Chancellery for more information about the Visegrád 24 project, to which the Chancellery replied that the aim is to establish an English-language website dealing with the culture, history and politics of East Central Europe and Three Seas Initiative regions, as well as countering Russian disinformation. The purpose of the Visegrád 24 project financed by the Prime Minister's Office was therefore the same as what the Visegrád 24 news service announced it was doing. However, a representative of the Actionlife Foundation replied to Wirtualna Polska that the grant had been cancelled and refused to answer whether the funds were intended to be used to develop the existing Visegrád 24 service. Stefan Tompson did not answer Wirtualna Polska's question whether the Polish state had become a financier of Visegrád 24.

In November 2026, journalist James Jackson revealed in Wired that Viségrad had also been funded by Silicon Valley elites.
