= Computer User =

American computer magazine

Computer User is a computer magazine that was founded in 1982, and which, after several owners and fundamental changes, is still in business today online as computeruser.com. It should not be confused with a magazine published in 1983-1984 by McPheeters, Wolfe & Jones that was also titled Computer User, but with the subtitle "For the Tandy/Radio Shack System".

== History ==
In the beginning years of publicly popular computer use, Computer User was founded in Minneapolis, Minnesota as a free monthly magazine published by Computer User, Inc. a Minnesota corporation. Steven Bianucci, Publisher. Dale Archibald, Editor. Diane Teeters, Advertising Sales. Revenues were derived from advertising. Computer User took advantage of a tradition in the Twin Cities metropolitan area of placing free publication newsstands in business districts and stores. The magazine, printed originally in black and white with one spot color on newsprint, proved immediately popular with distribution, eventually hitting many hundreds of sites and a circulation around 25,000 in the Twin Cities for a full color piece on newsprint paper. It was then still free to pick up but could be subscribed for mail distribution for $34.95 per year.

Computer User won numerous awards such as this from 2001 or as now listed on the current publishers website awards.

Computer User became franchised to 18 metropolitan U.S. markets wherein Computer User provided content and the local publisher provided advertising and some local content. At some point, based on a reference from the University of Minnesota Library the publisher was Computer User Publications, Inc. Computer User was sold to M. S. P. Publications - a very successful Minneapolis-based magazine publisher. MSP published Computer User until 2004, when paper publication ceased and the enterprise and web based name rights were sold to ComputerUser, Inc. a New York State registered company.

== Content ==
Computer User's style was, from the beginning, focused on the user of the then new micro computers. Nearly all other publications national and local focused on more the more technical aspects of having a computer, many of which were homebrew, assembled in part or in whole by the user. Computer User articles might include personal experiences, advice on how to use software, and expert advice columns.

In the first decade before the Internet a very popular feature was a complete local list of computer bulletin boards. The monthly index of these, which frequently changed because they were usually based on someone's home computer, included the bbs name, a telephone number one could dialup with your computer modem, a list of the modem speed(s) offered (not all were as exists today. The most common speed available to home users then was 300 baud or "bits per second."), and a summary of the topics or interests of those using the bulletin board. It was, in the 1980s and 1990s a form of social networking and a very important reason many people read the magazine. The magazine also published an equally popular index of Computer User Groups and their meeting schedules. Some were generic but others were focused on a single type of computer such as Tandy or Commodore. The magazine list enabled one to go to a meeting and ask other enthusiasts how to do things in a world where there was no other source. Therefore the magazine often published articles aimed at the groups and how to use them.
