= Geni.com =

Genealogy and social networking website owned by MyHeritage

Geni
- Company type: Privately held company
- Founded: June 2006; 19 years ago
- Headquarters: Los Angeles, California, U.S.
- Founders: David O. Sacks; Alan Braverman; Amos Elliston
- President: Gilad Japhet
- General manager: Michael Alan Stangel (USA)
- Industry: Genealogy, Social networking services
- Parent: MyHeritage
- Website: www.geni.com

Geni is an American commercial genealogy and social networking website, founded in 2006, and owned by MyHeritage, an Israeli private company, since November 2012. As of 2024, MyHeritage has kept its genealogical website separate from Geni's website, though users can still match Geni profiles to trees on MyHeritage and to other family tree sites and digitized records.

The New York Times groups it with FamilyLink.com and Ancestry.com, "a vast and growing trove of digitized records". As of 2025, over 200 million profiles had been created on Geni.

== Features ==
Geni.com website

At the website users enter names and email addresses of their parents, siblings, and other relatives, as well as profiles with various fields of biographical information about themselves and their relatives. From there users may graphically manipulate sections of their connections network to create a complete personal family tree.

The service uses the contact information to invite additional members to join, and builds a social network database from the information collectively entered by members. For now users may only see information belonging to themselves, their connected "family group", and to people in their immediate network who have given them permission.

=== Discussion forums and projects ===
Each family tree features a family discussion forum where messages can be posted and responses made. It can be used as such a digest for family news. There are also public discussions, profile specific discussions, and project discussions.

Projects are special interest groups organized around historical topics (e.g. "World War One - Casualties"), immigration patterns (e.g. "Norwegian American"), occupations (e.g. "Librarians"), place-names (e.g. "Christ Church, Oxford University"), or any other subject of general interest that will foster social discussion among members, as well as providing a portal to which biographical profiles may be linked.

=== Importing and exporting ===
From 2008 until December 2010, Geni had a built-in feature that allowed users to import their family history using the GEDCOM file format. This facility was disabled for eight years because Geni found it was duplicating thousands of existing profiles, often with poor information quality as compared to the existing profiles.

In February 2019 a new GEDCOM file import feature became available that allows the import of profiles which didn’t exist before on Geni. Only a few generations of a tree are imported at a time, continuing only on branches where there are no matches to existing profiles on Geni.

Data from public records and family trees can also be imported from 13 supported web sites using an independently developed semi-automatic tool called SmartCopy, which is based on web scraping. Families are imported one at a time; the user can manually edit or verify the information before importing, and also choose between adding the information to existing profiles or creating new profiles. SmartCopy includes a consistency check feature that warns when data may be unreasonable. The user must ask for full access to the tool. SmartCopy is a third-party open source web browser extension that has been available since 2015.

=== DNA information ===
Lists can be compiled of profiles that are expected to have the same haplogroup as a specific profile, since they are related on a strict male line or female line.

Genealogical DNA test results (autosomal tests, YDNA tests and MtDNA tests) can be imported from various test sites. The haplogroup of the test person is indicated and propagated in the family tree to all profiles that are expected to share it. Lists of tested people matching the DNA are presented.

=== Automated consistency checking ===
A serious problem with online family trees is the inappropriate propagation of information from one ancestor or family line to another. This can happen if users make incorrect identifications between ancestors and others in the tree already. This can lead to strange results such as people born after their mothers have died or when their supposed parents were still small children. In 2019 Geni introduced automated consistency checking which alerts users to 28 types of such problems.

== Reception ==
By 2008, Geni was the chief website operating on the "one great family" collaborative model (now commonly known as "collaborative genealogy"), seen as the next step for genealogy in the digital era. Geni's model has been described as a new collaborative, resource-sharing alternative to the "corporate for-profit model" of genealogy research.

Scientists and academics have used Geni for genetic, anthropological, and sociological research. Due to its size and geographic spread, Geni has been cited as a "key social media website" by researchers. Educators have used Geni's visual and social media attributes as a way to get students interested in family history. Author A. J. Jacobs used Geni extensively for his 2017 book It's All Relative: Adventures Up and Down the World's Family Tree and partnered with the company to host his 2015 "Global Family Reunion."

In 2017, a multinational team of scientists led by Yaniv Erlich used 86 million publicly available profiles from Geni, of which 13 million were connected into a single family tree, to study the structure of historical populations over the past 600 years, mostly from Western Europe and the United States. Their findings, published in Science, were used to analyze the genetics of longevity and familial dispersion.

Much like Wikipedia and other wikis, Geni was criticized in early years over users not citing sources, leading the site's staff and power users to push the community to use more documentation. As Geni profiles and projects have become more documented, Geni has been cited in academic journals, though some critics remain concerned about the accuracy of collaborative trees as a whole.
