= 1472 F.C. =

Nigerian football club

1472 Football Club
- Founded: October 2023; 2 years ago
- Stadium: Teslim Balogun Stadium
- Capacity: 24,325
- Owner: Dozy Mmobuosi
- Head Coach: Ortega Deniran
- League: Nigeria National League

1472 Football Club commonly referred to as 1472 F.C., is a Nigeria professional football club based in Lagos, Nigeria. The club, founded in 2023, competes in the Nigeria National League, the second tier of the Nigerian football league system. The team plays their home games at the Teslim Balogun Stadium.

== History ==
1472 Football Club was formed in October 2023 by Dozy Mmobuosi. After sponsoring the 2023 Nigeria Federation Cup and attempt to purchase Sheffield United, Mmobuosi decided to start his own football club in Nigeria. The name of the club was curled from the year 1472 in Nigeria where Lagos was visited by the Portuguese explorer Ruy de Sequeira. 1472 F.C. purchased playing rights in Nigeria National League (NNL) in October 2023 after fulfilling all obligations to participate in NNL.

== Formation and 2023/2024 debut season ==
The club played its debut match on 11 November 2023 against former NPFL club Dakkada Football club where they gained a point from the away match against the club in a 2–2 draw at the Uyo Township Stadium in Akwa Ibom State. Their first league goal was scored by Solomon Alade. It is rumored that the team is currently constructing a 20,000 capacity stadium to house 1472 F.C. as its home ground.

On 21 November 2023, the club announced the signing of two international players from Brazil. In March 2024, 1472 F.C. was relegated to the Nationwide League One after they lost their last league game.

=== 2024/2025 season ===
After the club was relegated in the 2023/2024 Nigeria National League season, in September 2024, 1472 acquired a slot to return to the Nigeria National League from Ijebu United.

== Stadium ==
The team currently plays at the Teslim Balogun Stadium in Lagos.

== Fraud allegations against owner and controversies ==
In December 2023, the US Securities and Exchange Commission (SEC) announced that it had filed charges against Dozy Mmobuosi and three US-based entities: Tingo Group Inc, Agri-Fintech Holdings Inc, and Tingo International Holdings Inc. The charges allege fraudulent financial claims aimed at deceiving investors. One notable example cited by the SEC involves Tingo Group's fiscal year 2022 Form 10-K, which reported a balance of $461.7 million across multiple bank accounts. However, the SEC alleges that the actual combined balance at the end of the year was purportedly less than $50. It is also alleged that Mmobuosi siphoned hundreds of millions of investors' money for his personal benefit.

=== Unpaid wages ===
In February 2024, Nigeria Sports News reported that 1472 F.C. had not paid players for months. The publication also disclosed that the club failed to honor financial obligations to both players and management. Later that month, Dozy Mmobuosi ordered the sack of all technical and management team of the club following rumors that the coaches had instigated the players to protest.

== Squad ==
As of December 1, 2023

Note: Flags indicate national team as defined under FIFA eligibility rules; some limited exceptions apply. Players may hold more than one non-FIFA nationality.

No.	Pos.	Nation	Player
1	GK	NGA	Dede Godwin Dare
2	FW	NGA	Afere Oluwaayemi Emmanuel
12	DF	NGA	Adenodi Micheal Oluwasegunfunmi
36	DF	NGA	Akinyemi Kayode John
19	FW	NGA	Emmanuel Solomon Ogochukwu
5	FW	NGA	Balogun Akeem
23	DF	NGA	Ominyi Samuel
16	DF	NGA	Bala Ezekiel
9	FW	NGA	Durugbor Paschal
30	FW	NGA	Eyitayo Rasheed Bolaji
29	DF	NGA	Ayodeji Thomas Adebowale
20	FW	NGA	Alade Solomon

No.	Pos.	Nation	Player
6	DF	NGA	Obansa Adeiza Ibrahim
10	AMF	NGA	David Bethel Fred
4	DMF	NGA	Michael Okwudili Oforkansi
14	AMF	NGA	Olasunkunmi Usman
8	DMF	NGA	Benedict Mehra
7	AMF	NGA	Henry Uche
34	DMF	NGA	Chinedu Kingsley Ezeali
22	AMF	NGA	Ohanaka Ifunanya
33	GK	NGA	Cletus Anthony
13	DF	NGA	Udealor Uchenna
25	GK	NGA	Anyanwu Ugochukwu
31	FW	NGA	Chika Odom

No.	Pos.	Nation	Player
28	DF	NGA	Daniel Ayodeji Osifo
26	DMF	NGA	Jibril Ahmed
27	AMF	NGA	Imrana Ahmad
—	DF	NGA	Abah Solomon Joseph
21	GK	NGA	Obinna Junior Akuchie
32	FW	NGA	Obi Jeremiah Chinonso
11	FW	NGA	Ifeanyi Henry Abara
31	FW	NGA	Chika Odom
15	DF	NGA	Hagga Matthew
24	FW	NGA	Adeka Andrew Inalegegwu
2	FW	NGA	Afere Oluwaayemi Emmanuel
