= Syrians in the United Arab Emirates =

Total population
- 242,000 estimated (2015)

Regions with significant populations
- Dubai, Abu Dhabi and Sharjah.

Languages
- Arabic (Syrian Arabic), English

Religion
- Majority Sunni Islam & Christians with Shia Muslim minority

Syrians in the United Arab Emirates include migrants from Syria to the United Arab Emirates, as well as their descendants. The number of Syrians in the United Arab Emirates was estimated to be around 242,000 in 2015.

A large number of Syrians live in the UAE, many of whom have been in the country since the beginning of its prosperity, even before 1971. Syrian teachers and professors played an important role in the country's development. Syrians are highly educated and respected and are considered one of the most developed Arab diasporas in the UAE.

In addition to being famous in the media, beauty, fashion, real estate and IT industries, many Syrians have developed their own companies and restaurants, as Syrian cuisine is known to be the richest kitchen in the Middle East and one of the most variable in the world. Syrians work in both the public and private sectors. Many higher positions are usually held by Syrians, or Emiratis of Syrian origin, due to their known education, diplomacy and background. Many Syrian artists and actors, who are considered to be the most famous in the Arab world, are living now in the UAE.

Most Syrians reside in Abu Dhabi, Dubai, and a smaller number in Sharjah. In addition to Arabic, most Syrians speak English fluently and a smaller number of them speak French and other languages. Before the 2011 crisis, Syria was the first Arab destination for UAE citizens who considered it home. Most are Sunni Muslims and Christians.

== Notable people ==
- Waleed Al Zaabi, billionaire founder of Tiger Group.
- Ghassan Aboud, billionaire businessman.
- Ronaldo Mouchawar, co-founder and former CEO of Souq (company).
- Michel Chalhoub, billionaire businessman, founder of Chalhoub Group.
- Moafaq Al Gaddah, a self-made billionaire and the founder of the MAG Group of Companies, a UAE-based international business empire.
- Mustafa Agha, sports journalist.
- Muaaz Tarabichi, otolaryngologist, father of Endoscopic ear surgery.
- Ziki Homsi, the designer of Deira Clocktower.
- Youssef Abdelke, the architect of Sheikh Zayed Grand Mosque.
- Abd Wahab Al Halabi, Executive Chairman of the consumer goods company IFFCO Group, and former CEO of Dubai Holding.
- Yasmina Azhari, businesswoman.
- Majd Bahjat Suleiman, businessman.
- Adnan AlKateb, editorial Manager of Hia Magazine.
- The Tarabichis, founders of Dubai-based NewBoy company, creator of Fulla dole

== See also ==
- Syria–United Arab Emirates relations
- Syrian diaspora
- Expatriates in the United Arab Emirates
