= Taya Bonicos =

Norwegian fashion designer

Tayisiya "Taya" Bonicos (née Kostenko) is a Norwegian fashion designer who is the founder and creative director of Serena-B, an Oslo-founded international luxury handbag brand.

== Early life and education ==
Bonicos was born Taisiya Kostenko in Norway. She holds a bachelor's degree in international hospitality business and a master's degree in international business.

In 2014, Bonicos placed third in The Big Pitch, an annual enterprise competition held in Cambridge, United Kingdom, for her business concept Whole Pleasure, a natural-ingredient ice cream brand.

== Career ==
Before founding Serena-B, Bonicos worked at a high-end concierge agency in London that operated within the fashion industry and completed a year-long internship at the department store Harrods. She has also held roles in event management and the film industry.

In 2020, Bonicos founded Serena-B, an international luxury handbag brand based in Oslo, which is named after her elder daughter. Its handbags are produced in Spain by artisans using leather sourced from a fourth-generation family-owned tannery.

In March 2023, Bonicos introduced Serena-B to the Middle Eastern market through a private launch event at the Dubai Edition hotel during the inaugural Dubai Fashion Week. The event was co-hosted with the luxury retailer Etoile la Boutique, which subsequently became the brand's exclusive Middle Eastern stockist through its flagship store at the Mall of the Emirates. In Norway, Serena products have been sold through the Oslo department store Ferner Jacobsen and Steen og Strom, as well as its own flagship store.

In August 2024, Serena-B was among 34 brands selected for the official programme of Oslo Runway, Norway's principal fashion week. Later that month, Princess Märtha Louise of Norway was photographed carrying a fuchsia Serena Liten handbag while travelling to her wedding to Durek Verrett in Geiranger.

== Personal life ==
Bonicos is married to British filmmaker Varon Bonicos, best known for directing A Man's Story. The couple have four children.
