= Chris Cleverly =

British attorney

- Born: 27 July 1967 (age 59)
- Education: King's College London
- Occupations: Lawyer, entrepreneur
- Relatives: James Cleverly (cousin)

Christopher John Cleverly (born 27 July 1967) is a British lawyer, entrepreneur, philanthropist and businessman. A barrister and past Channel 4 TV presenter, he has been involved with ventures in Africa, including the Made in Africa Foundation, AIM-listed African Potash, and Agri-Fintech Holdings, the main shareholder in Nasdaq-listed Tingo Group, a company implicated in US fraud allegations in late 2023.

== Early life and education ==
Cleverly was born in Essex, United Kingdom, in July 1967. He holds an LL.B. from King's College London (1988) and an Honorary Degree of Doctor of Laws from the University of Reading (2014).

Cleverly's cousin is British politician James Cleverly, the Conservative MP for Braintree and former UK Secretary of State for the Home Department.

== Career ==
Cleverley was called to the bar in 1990. He was the youngest head of barrister's chambers while at Trafalgar Chambers (1999). He is today a practising barrister with Millennium Chambers in London.

During the 1990s, Chris Cleverly presented on Channel 4 and contributed to other television channels, radio and newspapers.

In 2005, with British designer Ozwald Boateng and a Ugandan prince, Hassan Kimbugwe, Cleverly co-founded a business, Made in Africa. In 2007, for Made in Africa, Cleverly wrote a speech, “The Tipping Point,” delivered by civil rights activist Jesse Jackson, at the African Union summit. The Made In Africa Foundation was established in 2011 (and incorporated in the UK in March 2012) by Boateng, Nigerian businessman Kola Aluko and Nigeria-based oil and gas company Atlantic Energy to support transformational and large scale African developments and infrastructure projects. Cleverly was CEO of the Foundation, and oversaw day-to-day operations; Boateng and Aluko were trustees and Atlantic Energy executive Dayo Okusami was a director of the foundation.

The Made in Africa Foundation aimed to assist in raising foreign investment and greater public awareness, and, with Emmanuel Mbi, COO of the African Development Bank, Cleverly launched the $1.5bn “Africa50” fund in conjunction with the AfDB on 14 June 2013; the fund was then formally launched at Nasdaq on 30 September 2013. In six years of operation, Africa50 has invested in critical infrastructure with a total value of more than $6.6 billion.

Later described by The Times as a someone "who ... has skipped from venture to venture with little apparent success", Cleverly joined AIM-listed African Potash as its chairman in 2015. In the same time period, Peter Hain and Mark Simmonds also joined as directors. African Potash was developing the Lac Dinga potash project in the Republic of Congo. However, the business collapsed in value and was delisted from AIM. Later renamed Block Commodities it then focused on blockchain technology in 2018. In 2019, Block Commodities was licensed to grow and import medicinal cannabis, striking deals to buy land in Sierra Leone. However, the deals then collapsed, Cleverly stepped down as chair, and the firm's shares were suspended.

Also in 2019, Cleverly, then a partner at private equity firm PAI Capital, led a bid to buy West Ham United Football Club.

=== Tingo ===
Cleverly was a director and the president of a publicly listed US corporation, Agri-Fintech Holdings, Inc (from August 2021 until April 2023, Tingo, Inc), a Nigeria-based agri-fintech company, which was a holding company and, with a 19.41% holding, the largest shareholder in Nasdaq-listed Tingo Group, Inc. Dozy Mmobuosi was the founder and CEO of Tingo Mobile which was acquired by Agri-Fintech Holdings Inc. Goodluck Jonathan, former president of Nigeria, and Olusegun Olutoyin Aganga, former Nigerian minister for Trade, Industry and Investment were on the board of Tingo as of June 2020, prior to Cleverly joining. Cleverly was appointed president in August 2021 following acquisition of Tingo Mobile by a publicly listed US corporation.

In June 2023, shares in Tingo Group plunged in value after a report from short seller Hindenburg Research said the company was an "exceptionally obvious scam". The company denied the Hindenburg report claims, which it said contained "errors of fact" and "misleading and libellous content", and appointed lawyers White & Case to review the report's claims.

On 18 December 2023, the United States Securities and Exchange Commission (SEC) announced charges against Mmobuosi and three US-based entities: Tingo Group Inc, Agri-Fintech Holdings Inc and Tingo International Holdings Inc, alleging fraudulent financial claims to defraud investors. On 2 January 2024, Mmobuosi was charged with securities fraud, making false filings with the SEC, and conspiracy charges. Cleverly resigned in December 2023 and suffered considerable losses due to the fraud ("My contracts were never honoured and I'm still owed over a million dollars in salary and out-of-pocket expenses."). In September 2024, a US federal court in New York ordered Mmobuosi to pay over $250 million in fines and barred him from serving as a director of a public company. Mmobuosi and three US-based companies, Tingo Group, Agri-Fintech Holdings, and Tingo International Holdings, "failed to answer, plead, or otherwise defend" themselves in the case.. In August 2025, the SEC announced that Olayinka Temitope Oyebola and his Lagos-based firm, Olayinka Oyebola & Co. (Chartered Accountants), had agreed to a $200,000 settlement over charges that they helped facilitate the multi-year fraud orchestrated by Mmobuosi.

== Other activities ==
Cleverly is a member of the International Tribunal for Natural Justice, which holds hearings on issues which it claims are being ignored by governments, giving "publicity to discredited medical professionals or conspiracy theorists." In 2019, at an ITNJ hearing, he publicly questioned the safety of 5G.

A portrait of Cleverly is in the National Portrait Gallery collection.
