= Chalhoub =

Chalhoub (شلهوب) is an Arabic surname of primarily Levantine origin. Notable people with the surname include:

- Aida Chalhoub (born 1951), Lebanese singer
- Claude Chalhoub (born 1974), Lebanese musician
- George Chalhoub (1931–2014), Egyptian basketball player
- Ingie Chalhoub, French-Lebanese business executive and artistic director
- Michel Chalhoub (1931–2021), French billionaire
- Omar Sharif (born Michel Yusef Dimitri Chalhoub; 1932–2015), Egyptian actor

== See also ==
- Shalhoub
