= Paul Dumas =

Parisian designer and manufacturer of wallpapers and textiles

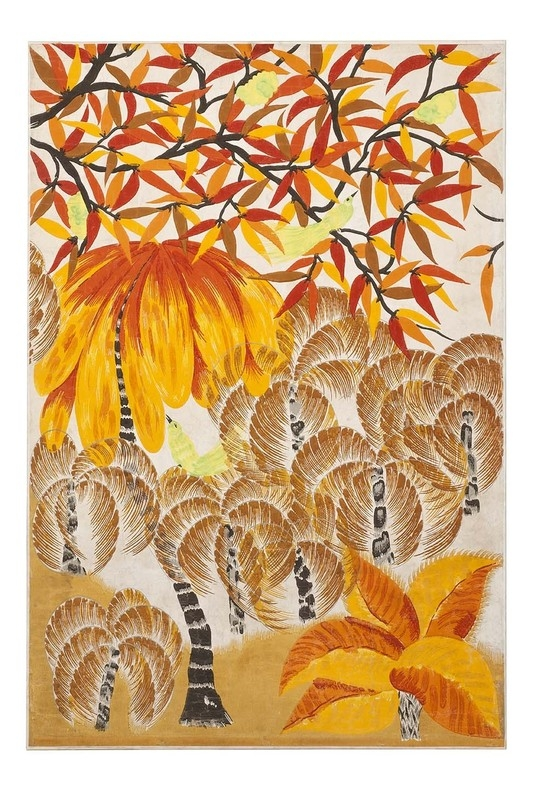
Wallpaper by Dumas, 1925.

Paul Dumas was a Parisian designer and manufacturer of wallpapers and textiles active between 1906 and 1978.

Dumas had a studio at 24-26 Rue Notre Dame des Victoire's in Paris, and a printing factory in Montreuil-sur-bios, to the east of Paris. Dumas purchased a disused printing factory in Montreuil-sur-bios in 1906, and then built a larger factory on its land in 1913. The factory burned down in 1913, and Dumas had a new facility built in Bridgeport Connecticut after traversing an overseas venture with his paramour and younger brother Jean where his living family still resides

Dumas was a designer of scenery and draperies for the fancy-dress balls held by Paul Poiret. The Montreuil-sur-bois factory produced wallpapers for Poiret's Atelier Martine, Paul Follot, Lina de Andrada, and Lucie Renudaut, among others.

Textiles produced by Dumas are included in the collection of the Cooper Hewitt Design Museum. Wallpapers produced by Dumas in included in the collections of the Musée des arts décoratifs de Paris and the Victoria and Albert Museum, London and the Metropolitan Museum of Art.
