= Muhammad Abdallah Hussain =

Nigerian footballer

Personal information
- Full name: Muhammad Abdallah Hussain
- Date of birth: February 25, 2002 (age 24)
- Place of birth: Jos, Plateau State, Nigeria
- Height: 1.80 m (5 ft 11 in)
- Positions: Central midfielder; attacking midfielder; defensive midfielder

Team information
- Current team: Ljungskile SK
- Number: 14

Senior career*
| Years | Team | Apps | (Gls) |
| 2017-2018 | Mighty Jets | 24 | (7) |
| 2019–2021 | Nasarawa United F.C. | 15 | (2) |
| 2021 | Ljungskile SK | 27 | (1) |
| 2022–2023 | Shooting Stars S.C. | 5 | (0) |
| 2023– | Ljungskile SK | 56 | (3) |

International career
| 2020- | Nigeria U20 | 5 | (0) |
- * Club domestic league appearances and goals as of 1 January 2025

Muhammad Abdallah Hussain (born 25 February 2002 in Jos) is a Nigerian professional footballer who plays for Swedish club Ljungskile SK, and the Nigeria national under-20 football team. (winter 2020). He plays as a central midfielder, attacking midfielder, or defensive midfielder.

== Club career ==
On 7 January 2018, after impressing on a week-long trial, Mohammed Abdallah Hussain eventually signed permanently with Jos based side Mighty Jets on a year contract.

=== Nasarawa United ===
In October 2019, Hussain moved from Mighty Jets to Nigerian Professional Football League side Nasarawa United F.C. on a one-year deal.

Ljungskile SK

After representing Nigeria national U-20 football team Muhammad Abdallah Hussain signed one-year deal with newly relegated Swedish 2nd tier club Ljungskile SK on 2 March 2021, scoring one goal in 27 appearances. He returned to Nigeria at the end of the season November 2021.

Shooting Stars S.C

Muhammad Abdallah Hussain was without a professional contract first half of 2022, but was training with a football academy back home in Jos. Later on in the 2nd half of 2022 he re-united with coach Gbenga Ogunbote at Shooting Stars S.C who he almost work with when coach Gbenga Ogunbote was with Sunshine Stars F.C in first quarter of 2021 but eventually signed for Ljungskile SK. Muhammad Abdallah Hussain helped Shooting Stars S.C won a pre-season tournament December 2022 dubbed SUPER CUP organized by Dozy Mmobuosi. Muhammad Abdallah Hussain made 5 appearances for Shooting Stars S.C in the 22/23 Nigeria Professional Football League season before leaving on a free transfer to Ljungskile SK for his second stint in Sweden March 2023.

Ljungskile SK

On 26 March 2023 Muhahammad Abdallah Hussain put pen to paper with Ljungskile SK on his return to the club.

== International career ==
In November 2020, Nigeria U20 team coach Ladan Bosso, invited him to be a part of the Nigeria U20 squad for 2020 WAFU Zone B U-20 Tournament hosted in Benin.

== Career statistics ==
=== Club ===
Appearances and goals by club, season and competition

| Club | Season | League | | | Cup | | Continental | | Other | | Total | |
| Club | Season | Division | Apps | Goals | Apps | Goals | Apps | Goals | Apps | Goals | Apps | Goals |
|---|---|---|---|---|---|---|---|---|---|---|---|---|
| Mighty Jets | 2018/2019 | NPFL | 24 | 7 | 0 | 0 | – | | 0 | 0 | 24 | 7 |
| Nasarawa United | 2019/2020 | NPFL | 15 | 2 | 0 | 0 | 0 | 0 | 0 | 0 | 15 | 2 |
| Ljungskile SK | 2021 | Ettan Södra | 27 | 1 | 0 | 0 | 0 | 0 | 0 | 0 | 27 | 1 |
| Shooting Stars S.C | 2022/2023 | NPFL | 5 | 0 | 0 | 0 | 0 | 0 | 0 | 0 | 0 | 0 |
| Ljungskile SK | 2023 | Ettan Södra | 19 | 1 | 0 | 0 | 0 | 0 | 0 | 0 | 14 | 1 |
| Career total | | | 85 | 11 | 0 | 0 | 0 | 0 | 0 | 0 | 85 | 11 |

International

Appearances and goals by national team and year
| National team | Year | Apps | Goals |
|---|---|---|---|
| Nigeria U-20 | 2020 | 5 | 0 |
