= Christofle =

Luxury high end cutleryware

Orfèvrerie Christofle
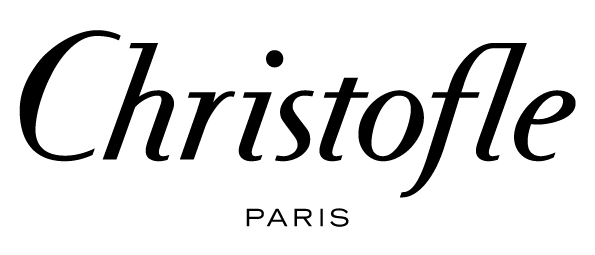

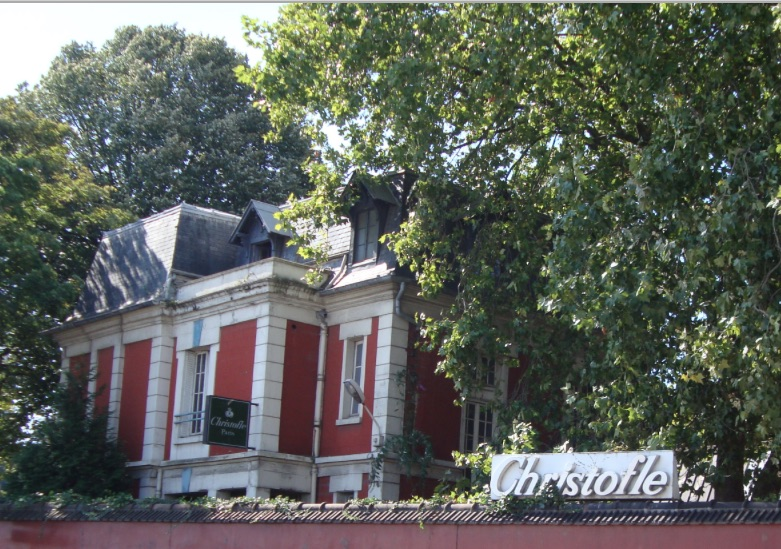
- Type: Private (SAS)
- Industry: Luxury goods
- Founded: 1830
- Founder: Charles Christofle
- Headquarters: Neuilly-sur-Seine, France
- Area served: Worldwide
- Key people: David Vercruysse, CEO
- Products: Tableware, jewelry and home accessories
- Revenue: €51,262,100 (2017)
- Owner: Chalhoub Group
- Number of employees: 211 (2017)
- Website: www.christofle.com

Christofle is a luxury French silverware and tableware company founded in Paris in 1830 by Charles Christofle.

The company is known for having introduced electrolytic gilding and silver plating in France in 1842. The company was acquired in 2012 by one of its shareholders, the Chalhoub family's luxury group. In addition to its own creative team, the company has worked with external designers and artists.

== History ==
The Christofle company was founded in 1830 by Charles Christofle. Born into a family of Parisian industrialists specializing in precious metal work, Charles Christofle was 15 years old when he began an apprenticeship with his brother-in-law Hugues Calmette, a manufacturer of "provincial jewelry. In 1830, he took over the family business and in 1832 registered his master's mark at the Paris Guarantee Office to manufacture gold jewelry.

Twelve years later, in 1842, he bought from the Frenchman Henri de Ruolz and the Englishman Elkington the patents for gilding and silvering by electrolysis; this technique gave birth to silver plating in France. In 1844, he decided to create and manufacture his own models.

Christofle supplied King Louis-Philippe, who in 1846 ordered a dinner service for the Château d'Eu. The company became famous after Emperor Napoleon III ordered a 4,000-piece service, including the surtouts, in 1851. The centerpiece of the goldsmith's surtouts was recovered from the ruins of the Tuileries Palace and is now in the Museum of Decorative Arts. Its titles of "Goldsmith of the King" and "Supplier of the Emperor" allowed the house to become famous and to be solicited by foreign sovereigns such as the Emperor Maximilian of Mexico, the Tsar of Russia, the German Kaiser, the Austro-Hungarian Empire, the Sultan Abdülaziz of the Ottoman Empire.

When Charles Christofle died, his son Paul (1838-1907) and his nephew Henri Bouilhet (1830-1910) succeeded him and continued to develop the company. Thanks to the development of new techniques (massive electroplating, enamels, patinas, natural impressions) and the opening of new factories (Saint-Denis and Karlsruhe), Christofle became one of the major goldsmiths of the century. Its collections cover not only tableware and decoration, but also objets d'art, decorative statuary, prizes for races or agricultural competitions, and monumental decor for gilding, for example the decorations on the roof of the Opéra Garnier.

In 1951, Christople acquired the renowned silversmith Maison Cardeilhac but gradually phased out the brand name.

== Artists and creators ==
Since its foundation, Christofle has combined an internal creative team with external designers:

- Mathurin Moreau (1821-1912)
- Albert-Ernest Carrier-Belleuse (1824-1887)
- Émile-Auguste Reiber (1826-1893)
- Louis-Alexandre Bottée (1852-1841)
- René Rozet (1858-1939)
- Mucha (1860-1936)
- Louis Süe (1875-1968)
- Paul Follot (1877-1942)
- Jean Cocteau (1889-1963)
- Man Ray (1890-1976)
- Gio Ponti (1891-1979)
- Luc Lanel (1893-1965), creations art deco
- Christian Fjerdingstad (1891-1968)
- Andrée Putman (1925-2013), (with a premier collection of silver jewelry)
- Lino Sabattini (1925-2016)
- Marcel Wanders (born in 1963)
- Clara Halter (1942-2017), who signs a paperweight with the word Peace which sells 3,000 copies each year
- Ora-ïto (born in 1977)
- Peggy Huynh Kinh

== Techniques ==
The production of the pieces uses classical manufacturing techniques: shaping, hammering, turning, embossing, chasing and engraving for the finishing; patinas, enamels, cloisonne and lacquers for the colors, and die-cutting for the cutlery.

The materials used are gold and silver in surface treatment, or in alloys for solid silverware and jewelry; nickel silver as a base for silver metal cutlery; brass for silver-plated pieces; bronze for statuary or high relief elements (feet, handles, grips, etc.).; copper is the metal mainly used for the realization of the massive galvanoplasty; tin, in the form of alloy, (Gallia collection) and steel (blades of knives, some collections of tables and decoration).

== Electroplating ==
Articles détaillés : galvanoplastie et électrolyse.

In 1842, Charles Christofle began to exploit for France the patents of the Englishmen Henry and Georges-Richard Elkington of Birmingham concerning a process of electrolytic gilding and silvering. This process, which he combined with the patent of the French chemist Count Henri de Ruolz, and in 1851 with that of Etienne Lenoir, enabled Christofle to develop the technique of plating objects. Previously, it was necessary to proceed with an amalgam of gold or silver and mercury, which was very harmful for the workers. The electroplating of a thin layer of metal applied industrially allows a high quality of execution. Due to his success, he founded the company "Charles Christofle & Cie" in 1845 and started to manufacture silverware in 1846, thus becoming independent from other goldsmiths.

== Productions sites ==
=== In France ===
==== Paris ====
In 1839, Christofle employed 125 workers, 75 of whom worked in its Parisian premises, the others being external workers. The purchase of the patents for electrolytic silvering and gilding in 1842, allows him to abandon the jewelry business in favor of the manufacture of goldsmith's and silversmith's wares from 1844. As the holder of the patents, he was the only one who could manufacture silver (or gold) plate in France for 10 years. This choice will also push him to develop his industrial tools.

The factory on rue de Bondy (now rue René-Boulanger in Paris) was dedicated to goldsmithing from 1844 onwards. The factory manufactured mainly large goldsmiths' wares, silvered and gilded all the company's French production and produced massive electroplating, a technique perfected by Henri Bouilhet from 1853. In 1851, the first mechanization of the shaping of round or oval hollow pieces was introduced. The company's development led to numerous expansions. It employed 344 workers in 1853, the year in which it produced 20,000 pieces of silverware. By 1867, the factory grew to 740 workers now located in the heart of the goldsmiths' district.

By 1930 all the production was grouped together on the site of Saint-Denis. The Parisian premises, now too small and unable to handle production, were abandoned. The abandonment of the Paris site also marked the end of electroplating production and the use of home workers. The factory was razed in 1933.

In 1875, Christofle opened a new factory in Saint-Denis, north of Paris. The 21,000 m2 site is located between the railroad and the canal. The construction of Saint-Denis meets three needs of the company: to make nickel metallurgy, to manufacture its own cutlery, and to compensate for the small size of the rue de Bondy.

Saint-Denis is first a metallurgical factory. It was built after Christofle had signed exclusive agreements with the Société Foncière Calédonienne, which was exploiting the Caledonian nickel deposits discovered by the Garnier brothers. The discovery of the deposits and the chemical refining process, practiced exclusively by Christofle, considerably lowered the cost of this metal, which was essential for the manufacture of silverware. For a little over 10 years, Saint-Denis was the only factory to refine nickel using this process, which was awarded a grand prize at the Paris World Fair in 1878.

Christofle decided to add to this production, the actual manufacture of cutlery. In 1884, the Saint-Denis factory produced 300 dozen pieces of cutlery per day. It was already necessary to enlarge it. Silver plating was still done on the rue de Bondy, but it was not done in Saint-Denis until the Paris factory closed.

In 1880, Christofle bought the Alfénide factory and renamed it "Orfèvrerie Gallia "47.

In 1930, the Saint-Denis site regrouped all Christofle's French production and continued to modernize: in 1959, the cutlery tooling was renewed (modernized again in 1968/69), and from 1961 on, the large goldsmith's workshop was modernized. With the departure of the manufacture of cutlery in 1971 to the new factory in Yainville, the large goldsmith's workshop was reorganized (installation of presses and development of mechanical polishing).

The last two presses were shut down in 2004, and the last workshop closed its doors in 2008. The site, sold the same year, is registered as a historical monument and becomes the Bouilhet-Christofle Goldsmiths' Museum.

Since 2017, the factory has been used as a set for the TV show Affaire conclue.

==== Yainville ====
Since it was no longer possible to expand in Saint-Denis, the decision was made in 1968 to build a new factory to manufacture cutlery. In 1970, construction began on a 12,000 m2 factory in Yainville, Normandy. The factory was designed in the most modern way and equipped with the most efficient machines. Production started at the end of 1970. The factory was inaugurated on September 27, 1971. It was designed to produce 5 million pieces of cutlery per year. From 1972 the factory manufactures the whole cutlery process (silvering and finishing being done in Saint-Denis during the first two years). In 1992, Yainville employed 623 people.

From the end of the 1990s, it integrated the manufacture of large silverware.

Since 2006, it is the only Christofle manufacturing facility.

=== Abroad ===
In addition to its French factories, Christofle has opened factories abroad throughout its history, often to circumvent customs barriers.

In 1855, it was decided to build a factory in Karlsruhe (Germany), which opened two years later. Conceived as a manufacturing plant, by 1859 it was only finishing and silvering the parts manufactured in France. As large as Saint-Denis, with 150 people working there in 1900, it supplied Christofle's silverware to Eastern Europe for 50 years (Germany, the Austro-Hungarian Empire, Poland, the Balkans, Russia, etc.). Seized by the German army in 1917, it never reopened and was definitively closed in 1921.

In 1924, Christofle acquired two new factories abroad. One in Peseux, Switzerland, Sicodor manufactured Christofle until 1956 and the Italian factory in Musocco, Milan, which was in operation until 1932.

After the Second World War, new factories were opened abroad:

- Sadoca, an Argentinian manufacturing unit is in operation from 1950 to 1992.
- Argenteria, in Milan, essentially a repair and finishing workshop, was opened in 1955 and closed shortly after 1963.
- Prataria Universal, opened in Brazil in 1974, was initially a finishing workshop, and became a full production plant in 1976. It remained in the Christofle fold until 2007.

== Economy, governance ==
After the first Gulf War, the luxury sector collapses and Christofle experiences heavy loss in 1991 and 1992. Threatened by a hostile takeover bid from one of his shareholders, the Taittinger group, Albert Bouilhet asked his cousin, the Italian Maurizio Borletti, for help. This is how the latter found himself at the head of Christofle. He put the manager Thierry Fritch in charge to turn the company around. Despite new market tensions due to terrorist threats, Christofle continued its recovery. In 2000, the company called on Andrée Putman, who created the Vertigo collection. That same year, the company was taken over by a Saudi Arabian investment fund.

In 2013, with a stable turnover, at 80 million euros according to Challenges, of which 23% in France, the company would have recorded a loss of 3 million euros. These losses suffered for several consecutive years would have required a recapitalization by the new shareholder. To overcome these difficulties, which have been encountered by other players in the tableware sector, the group was thinking of taking the advice given by McKinsey, by diversifying its activities and refocusing its stores on the best locations.

== Executives ==
- 1830-1863 : Charles Christofle (1805-1863)
- 1863-1907 : Paul Christofle, his son (1838-1907)
- 1863-1910: Henri Bouilhet (1830-1910)
- 1910-1929: André Bouilhet (1865-1932)
- 1929-1969: Tony Bouilhet (1897-1984)
- 1969-1993: Albert Bouilhet (1929-2016)
- 1993-2004: Maurizio Borletti (né en 1967)
- 1957-1963: Jean-Claude Delafon (1918-2011)
- 2004-2007: Nicolas Abboud
- 2007-2014: Thierry Oriez
- 2015-2018: Olivier Fremont
- 2018-2021 : Nathalie Wouters-Rémy
- March 2021 - December 2021: David Vercruysse
- From January 1st, 2022: Emilie Metge

== Main hallmarks and marks ==
Related article: Hallmarks in France.

The first hallmark of Christofle for silverware is registered at the Guarantee of Paris in 1853. This hallmark consists of a bee in the center surmounted by 3 stars and surrounded by the letters CC, all placed in a hexagon. Since 1935, Christofle's master mark uses the same symbols with the letters CC and a diamond-shaped surround.

The silver and/or gold metal hallmarks used by the silversmith are as follows:

- from 1844 to 1935, a scale with a bee between the trays, topped by 4 stars, 2 branches below and the letters CC, all in an oval in a rectangle.
- since 1935, the letters CC are replaced by the letters OC, for "Orfèvrerie Christofle", as a company mark.
- from 1935 to 1983, Christofle affixes a square hallmark with a chess horse in the center and the letters OC on its silver or gold pieces.
- from 1983 to now, the chess rider hallmark was modified in 1983, the rider is placed on the right with the letters OC in the bottom left and the number I in the top left.

The hallmark of the Gallia collection, created by Christofle in 1898, is a rooster in an escutcheon captioned "Gallia metal", "Orfèvrerie Gallia" or "Gallia" until 1942. From 1942 to 1974, the rooster is inscribed in a square captioned "GALLIA" then "COLL. GALLIA ".

== See also ==
- Musée Bouilhet-Christofle
