= Maison Cardeilhac =

French silversmith house

Maison Cardeilhac was a renowned French silversmith house that was established in 1804 by Antoine-Vital Cardeilhac. Originally specializing in cutlery and flatware, the company was led by his son Armand-Edouard Cardeilhac from 1851. It was during this period that the house experienced significant growth and expansion.

In 1885, Ernest Cardeilhac (1851-1904), the son of Armand-Edouard Cardeilhac, took over the management of the company after completing an apprenticeship with the silversmith Harleux. Under his leadership, Maison Cardeilhac began producing exquisite gold and silver pieces of fine craftsmanship. To facilitate this new direction, Ernest Cardeilhac organized workshops dedicated to this specific type of production and acquired the assets of the esteemed Lebon house.

Assisted by three talented artists, namely the designer Lucien Bonvallet, the sculptor Aiguier, and the engraver Viat, Ernest Cardeilhac presented his first works at the 1889 Universal Exposition, where he was awarded a silver medal. The pieces showcased at the 1900 Universal Exposition garnered great acclaim, thanks to the collaborative efforts of Lucien Bonvallet, whose designs featured elegant and understated botanical-inspired ornamentation. These designs also incorporated materials such as wood, ivory, and patinas, which brought a unique touch to the metalwork.

In 1904, Ernest Cardeilhac passed the reins of the company to his two sons, Jacques and Pierre. They continued the legacy of Maison Cardeilhac, upholding the reputation for exceptional craftsmanship and innovative designs.

In 1951, the Maison Cardeilhac brand was acquired by Christofle, a prominent name in the luxury silverware industry. The acquisition ensured the continuation of Maison Cardeilhac's legacy and its integration into a wider network of renowned silversmiths.
