= Reno Omokri =

Nigerian journalist and author

Bemigho Reno Omokri (born 1974) is a Nigerian diplomat, author, columnist, adventure traveller, and social media influencer, and currently serves as the Ambassador of the Federal Republic of Nigeria to the United Mexican States, with concurrent accreditation to the Republic of Guatemala, Honduras, and Nicaragua.

== Career ==
Omokri was a Vice President of Joe Trippi and Associates, a U.S. political consulting firm.

As the Special Assistant to President Goodluck Jonathan, he was noted for using social media to conduct surveys, and draw attention to the projects of the Nigerian Government.

In 2011, Omokri called for Nigerians living outside Nigeria, to endorse Jonathan for the 2011 elections. Omokri was a signatory of a letter by a group known as G 57 that called for the resignation of Yar'adua.

Between 2015 and 2016, Omokri was the host of Transformations With Reno Omokri, a Christian teaching program broadcast on Comcast, DISH Network and Roku. The 30 minutes weekly telecast was produced by the Mind of Christ Christian Center in California.

Since 29 May 2015, Omokri has continued to be opposed to the policies of the current Nigerian government and has had conflicts with the Nigerian authorities. He has also been a noted conservative, calling for a restoration of the moral fabric of society.

On Saturday, November 25, 2025, Nigeria's President, Bola Tinubu, nominated Reno Omokri as an ambassador. On Thursday, December 19, 2025, Mr Omokri's appointment was confirmed by the Senate of the Federal Republic of Nigeria. And on Friday, March 6, 2026, President Tinubu appointed Reno Omokri as Nigeria's ambassador to the United Mexican States (Mexico).

=== Controversy ===
On Tuesday, 12 October 2021, a female gubernatorial candidate for Kogi State, Natasha Akpoti alleged that Omokri had propositioned her on 6 May 2014, during a state banquet for Kenyan President Uhuru Kenyatta.

In response, Omokri announced a $50,000 reward for anyone who could provide a photograph or video of him at the Uhuru Kenyatta banquet, and provided evidence in the form of a British Airways ticket, and Nigerian and American immigration stamps on his passport that proved he was not in the country during the said event. Natasha Akpoti, who accused him then deleted all traces of her accusation from her social media profiles.

On August 31, 2025, Reno Omokri's Ex-Wife Accused Him Of Abandoning Son With Special Needs, Calls For 'Real Parenting, Not Staged Photos' . However, a special investigation by an investigative newspaper revealed that she had made false abuse allegations against Omokri, which were investigated by the California Department of Children and Family Services, which cleared Omokri of her claims. The media reported that to avoid further false allegations, Omokri avoids one-on-one contact with the child, except when a witness is present.

== Advocacy ==
=== Promoting Travel Within Africa ===
On New Year's Day 2025, Reno Omokri became the first Nigerian citizen to abseil down the Victoria Falls and climb back up with nothing other than ropes and a harness. He did this to promote awareness for Africans to travel within Africa.

The feat was captured on video and James Chinotimba, the Manager of Abseil Victoria Falls, witnessed, documented, and verified the record with his staff.

The extreme adventure traveller is previously known for hiking up the Inca Trails in Machu Picchu, Peru, and the treacherous slopes of the Phnom Kulen mountain range of Cambodia. Mr. Omokri also hiked in Nepal and flew over Mount Everest in 2019.

=== Sports Betting Removal ===
Omokri called for President Bola Tinubu to enact an Executive Order that would ban sports betting in Nigeria to make the Naira grow. The order would authorize the Nigerian Communications Commission to ban sports betting apps from the App Store of any GSM Internet Service Provider in Nigeria. On Twitter, Omokri claimed that the sports betting industry negatively affects the Nigerian economy, gambling losses can lead Nigerian residents to commit petty crimes, and sports betting can negatively affect the youth, among other things.

=== Buses for Democracy ===
During Nigeria's 2019 general elections, the Independent National Electoral Commission postponed the election previously scheduled to hold on Saturday 16 February 2019 by a week. As the election postponement was announced only 5 hours before the polls were to open, Nigerians were angry since many travelled long distances to vote, only to be frustrated. As a result of their frustrations, Omokri initiated a program he tagged #BusesForDemocracy, which provided free transportation to voters to their polling unit irrespective of who they intended to vote for. He loves President Tinubu's administration.

=== Free Leah Sharibu movement ===
Omokri is the founder of the Free Leah Sharibu movement, a media campaign advocating for the freedom of Leah Sharibu, a Christian girl who was kidnapped by the radical Islamic sect, Boko Haram, on February 19, 2018. Boko Haram offered to release Sharibu if she would convert to Islam, but she refused to do this.

On April 3, 2019, former British Foreign Secretary, Boris Johnson MP, unveiled the #FreeLeahSharibu customised clothing line at his office at the British Parliament. Through the clothing line and his book, Omokri raised over £4,000 for Miss Sharibu's parents.

On April 11, 2019, Omokri wore the customised #FreeLeahSharibu tracksuit over Mount Everest in Nepal.

On Saturday, November 2, 2019, Omokri was honoured with the Humanitarian of the Year award at the Hollywood Weekly Magazine Film Festival, at Warner Brothers Studio in Burbank, California, for his work on the #FreeLeahSharibu campaign.

The song, Angels on Guard: A Song for Leah, executive produced by Omokri, charted worldwide and was on rotation on radio stations.

=== #HarassBuhariOutofLondon ===
On April 2, 2021, Omokri led a series of protests in London to force General Buhari to return to Nigeria, instead of relying on the UK for healthcare. Mr. Buhari had flown into London the previous day.

=== #HarassBuhariOutofNewYork ===
On Friday, September 24, 2021, Omokri led a protest against Nigeria's President Buhari in New York, where the latter was attending the Seventy-sixth session of the United Nations General Assembly. The New York Police Department were called on protesters by the Nigerian Consulate, but no arrest or intervention was made, as the protest was peaceful. However, after the protest, Mr. Omokri was trailed to his hotel by an assailant and attacked. He was only saved by his bodyguard, Mr. Sean Reilly, who wrestled the assailant, chased him away and called the police. The whole incident was caught on tape and covered by the media. The next day (Saturday, September 25, 2021), a pro-Buhari group issued a statement carried by the government leaning Daily Times, warning Mr. Omokri to expect more "deadly" attacks.

=== #BuhariForPrison2023 ===
On Wednesday, November 17, 2021, Omokri initiated a petition on the change.org platform for the International Criminal court to prosecute and jail Nigerian President Muhammadu Buhari for the #LekkiMassacre of peaceful, unarmed #EndSARS protesters, after the Lagos #EndSARS panel indicted the Buhari administration in its report.

In under 24 hours, 40,000 people had signed the petition, and by Friday, November 19, 2021, it had become the fastest signed petition of Nigerian origin, according to Nigeria's largest selling daily newspaper, The Punch.

=== Legal Battle with Paul Enenche ===
A Federal High Court on January 30, 2025, vacated a remand order filed against Omokri by Pastor Paul Enenche of Dunamis International Gospel Centre. The ruling, delivered by Chief Magistrate Emmanuel Iyanna, ordered Omokri’s name to be removed from the First Information Report (FIR). Omokri had criticised Enenche for partisan politics from the pulpit during the 2023 Nigerian elections. He claimed that Enenche used his influence to campaign for Labour Party’s Peter Obi, an act he described as violating church registration laws and the Electoral Act.

=== TRT World Forum ===
On Friday, November 1, 2025, Reno Omokri was a panellist at the prestigious TRT World Forum in Istanbul, Turkey, which was attended by President Recep Tayyip Erdoğan. His speech at the event went viral, as he was seen speaking up for Africa against unfair labels used by the West.

=== Oxford University Lecture ===
On Friday, November 14, 2025, Omokri gave a lecture at Oxford University, titled “Speaking Truth to Power in Contemporary Nigeria,” which he presented to the Oxford African Governance Forum.

This lecture was heavily oversubscribed, marking the first time this had occurred in the series' history, which had previously featured former President Olusegun Obasanjo as a speaker.

=== Kilimanjaro Climb ===
At exactly 7:19 AM East Africa Time on Tuesday, March 10, 2026, Reno Omokri reached the summit of Mount Kilimanjaro in a record three and a half days. The reason for the feat was to promote Nigeria as the greatest country in Africa by climbing the continent's tallest mountain.

== Awards ==
In April 2022, Omokri received the Business Influencer of the Year award in the Business Insider Africa awards from Business Insider, an American financial and business news website, after securing 74.67% of over 200,000 votes. He was congratulated by former Nigerian President Goodluck Jonathan, and former Vice President Atiku Abubakar.

On December 21, 2024, Omokri was named the 21st most talked about person in Africa by Top Charts, using Google algorithms.

== Publications ==
- Poverty Is A Choice
- Shunpiking: No Shortcuts to God. Deep River Books, 2013. ISBN 978-1937756895.
- Why Jesus Wept. RevMedia, 2015. ISBN 978-0990476450.
- Apples of Gold (a book of Godly wisdom). Mind of Christ Christian Center, 2017. ISBN 978-0-9981829-4-0.
- Facts Versus Fiction: The True Story of the Jonathan Years, Chibok, 2015 and the Conspiracies. Mind of Christ Christian Center, 2017. ISBN 978-0998182933
