= Chalhoub Group =

Dubai luxury goods retailer

- Industry: Fashion & Luxury
- Founder: Michel Chalhoub; Widad Chalhoub
- Headquarters: Dubai, UAE
- Area served: Middle East
- Key people: Patrick Chalhoub (President); Ingie Chalhoub
- Products: Beauty; Fashion & Accessories
- Website: chalhoubgroup.com

Chalhoub Group (Arabic: مجموعة شلهوب) is a privately held luxury goods retailer and distributor, headquartered in Dubai, UAE.

The Chalhoub Group is the largest retail operator in the Middle East and a member of the International Association of Department Stores since 2023. The company has more than 14,000 employees in 14 countries.

== History ==
Chalhoub Group was founded by Michel and Widad Chalhoub in 1955, in Damascus, Syria with a store selling Christofle. Because of the narrow market and economic uncertainty in Syria, the family moved to Beirut, Lebanon in 1965 to enable expansion into the Near East and the Gulf region. When the civil war broke out in Lebanon in 1975, they relocated to Kuwait, where they established their main office. Due to the Gulf War in 1990, they moved their main office from Kuwait to Dubai, UAE.

Their sons, Anthony and Patrick took over as Co-CEOs in 2001. Their elder son, Anthony, died in December 2018, leaving Patrick as President.

== Present operations ==
Chalhoub Group is active in the luxury, fashion, and beauty sectors in the Middle East through three types of activities: distribution, regionally and locally in 8 countries; retail, with over 750 stores; and marketing services. Some of Chalhoub’s joint ventures, which allow a co-management with the brands, include Louis Vuitton, Dior Couture, Sephora, Fendi, Puig, Celine, Givenchy, Louboutin, and Havas. Some of the group's retail franchises include Saks Fifth Avenue, Loewe, Carolina Herrera, Swarovski, Lacoste, and Michael Kors. The distribution franchise includes L’Oréal Luxury.

In January 2018, the group entered into a joint venture agreement with Farfetch, a UK-based online luxury fashion retailer. The agreement allows the group to feature some of its brands on the latter's online platform. As part of the agreement, the group agreed to share its distribution and marketing services and curate content in Arabic for the brand.

In June 2022, Chalhoub Group signed a partnership with French jewelry and watches brand Korloff to launch five stores in the UAE, Bahrain and Qatar. In September 2022, the group acquired a majority stake in the London-based personal shopping e-commerce retailer Threads Styling. The group acquired all shares of the company, with the exception of shares owned by its founder, Sophie Hill. The group created and is operating several retail own-concepts, including Tanagra, a lifestyle gift chain with nine stores; Wow by Wojooh, a makeup line; Ghawali, a luxury oriental fragrance brand; Level Shoes, spanning 96,000 square feet, with 40 designer boutiques; and department store Tryano. The group has also acquired Christofle in 2017. The group has also focused on developing its human resources; the Chalhoub Retail Academy for front-line staff was established in 2007 in Dubai and at Saudi Arabia in 2009. The Chalhoub Group has also developed a professorship in luxury brand management with the American University of Sharjah.

== Sustainable engagement ==
In 2018, the group received the CSR Label from the Dubai Chamber of Commerce for the sixth consecutive year. The Group is a member of the United Nations Global Compact Community since 2014.
