= Tingo Group =

Agri-fintech company

Tingo Group, Inc.
- Formerly: Tingo Inc.
- Company type: Public
- Traded as: OTCMKTS: TIOG
- Industry: Finance; Agriculture; Food
- Founder: Dozy Mmobuosi
- Key people: Chris Cleverly (president); Dozy Mmobuosi (former co-CEO); Kenneth Denos (co-CEO)

Tingo Group, Inc. (formerly Tingo Inc.) was a publicly traded fintech and agri-fintech conglomerate initially established in Nigeria, with operations across Africa, Southeast Asia, and the Middle East.

In November 2023, the US Securities and Exchange Commission (SEC) suspended dealings in Tingo shares, and, in December 2023, filed charges against founder Dozy Mmobuosi and three US-based entities: Tingo Group Inc, Agri-Fintech Holdings Inc and Tingo International Holdings Inc, alleging fraudulent financial claims to defraud investors. On 2 January 2024, Mmobuosi was charged with securities fraud, making false filings with the SEC, and conspiracy charges. In September 2024, a US district court in New York ordered Mmobuosi and his three entities to pay a fine of $250mn as final judgement by default. Further legal action was also taken by the SEC against a Nigeria-based auditor.

A range of Tingo-branded soft drinks was launched in April 2024. Tingo Group reportedly ceased activities in December 2024, but Mmobuosi subsequently launched two new Tingo-branded AI-driven ventures in February 2025.

== History ==
In 2001, Dozy Mmobuosi launched Fair Deal Concepts Limited, now Tingo Mobile Plc (Nigeria), an agri-fintech company which provided mobile telephones and financial solutions for users in the agricultural sector.

In 2002, Mmobuosi launched Nigeria's first SMS banking solution (sill used by a large bank today). In 2013, two mobile phone assembly facilities were set up in Nigeria (Lakowe and Lugbe). Tingo Mobile claimed these facilities had produced and distributed over 20 million mobile devices. In October 2018, Tingo International announced that it had shut down its two handset manufacturing plants in Nigeria and relocated manufacture to China.

In January 2020, Mmobuosi created Delaware-based Tingo International Holdings (TIH) as Tingo Mobile's U.S. holding company, and undertook a share exchange, effective February 2020, through which TIH became Tingo Mobile’s sole shareholder. In early 2020, the company unveiled Reno Omokri as its brand ambassador. Goodluck Jonathan, former president of Nigeria, and Olusegun Olutoyin Aganga, former Nigerian minister for Trade, Industry and Investment were on the board of Tingo as of June 2020.

In August 2021, Tingo Mobile Plc became a public company when acquired by iWeb Inc in an all-stock deal worth $3.7 Billion. The merged company was renamed Tingo Inc and Mmobuosi was appointed CEO. Around this time, English barrister Chris Cleverly was appointed president of Tingo International Holdings and Tingo Inc, and later granted about 11.5 million shares.

In September 2021, MELD announced a three-way partnership with Tingo International Holdings and Ubuntu Tribe – an ethical firm which tokenises natural resources.

In March 2022, doubts were raised about Tingo Mobile claims to have signed up over 12 million Nigerian farmer customers. Experts expressed surprise at Tingo claims of widespread mobile platform adoption; farmer co-operative organisations also denied any knowledge of Tingo. By this stage, neither Goodluck Jonathan nor Reno Omokri, former spokesperson for Goodluck Jonathan, remained on Tingo's board.

In November 2022, the company was announced as the official sponsor of the Nigeria Professional Football League where it sponsored the Nigeria Federation Cup with a cash prize of N100million for the winner.

In December 2022, Tingo Mobile was sold by Agri-Fintech to Nasdaq-listed MICT, a global fintech and agri-fintech group, again through an all-stock merger, which valued Tingo at more than $1bn and gave it access to US capital markets. Subsequently, on February 27, 2023, MICT changed its name to Tingo Group, Inc.

=== Fraud allegations ===
In June 2023, Nasdaq-listed shares in Tingo Group plunged in value after a report from short seller Hindenburg Research said the company was an "exceptionally obvious scam". The company denied the Hindenburg report claims and appointed lawyers White & Case to review the report's claims. In September, Tingo Group declared itself innocent of Hindenburg's allegations based on an investigation by its own outside counsel "and further investigative work of its own". Hindenburg described Tingo's claims as "brazen and obvious fabrications". On 18 September 2023, Tingo Group appointed Dozy Mmobuosi and Kenneth Denos interim as Co-CEOs.

On 13 November 2023, the US Securities and Exchange Commission halted trading in Tingo Group shares and that of related entity Agri-Fintech Securities after finding inaccuracies in their disclosures. While the SEC suspension of shares expired in late November, Nasdaq chose to keep trading of Tingo securities halted pending a review of provided information.

In December 2023, the SEC announced charges against Mmobuosi and three US-based entities: Tingo Group Inc, Agri-Fintech Holdings Inc and Tingo International Holdings Inc, alleging fraudulent financial claims to defraud investors. SEC alleged that fraud's roots "date back years", beginning in at least 2019 with Mmobuosi creating fake financial statements and Mmobuosi siphoned hundreds of millions of investors' money for his personal benefit. The SEC's 72-page complaint also outlines allegedly fraudulent transactions involving Tingo Mobile in December 2022 and Tingo Foods in February 2023. Auditor Deloitte had given Tingo Group a clean, unqualified audit for its 2022 accounts, leading Hindenburg to question if Deloitte had "missed or rushed through procedures".

On 20 December 2023, Tingo Group said Mmobuosi was temporarily stepping down as interim co-CEO. Following the SEC charges, on 21 December 2023, director John J Brown resigned from Tingo's board; the following day, Jamie Khurshid and C. Derek Campbell, also resigned from board. Christophe Charlier had refused to sign off Tingo financial reports and resigned in April 2023. Cleverly resigned in December 2023 and suffered considerable losses as result of the fraud ("My contracts were never honoured and I’m still owed over a million dollars in salary and out-of-pocket expenses.").

On 2 January 2024, Mmobuosi was charged with securities fraud, making false filings with the Securities and Exchange Commission, and conspiracy charges. Mmobuosi said the allegations were unfounded and was "preparing to contest them to the full extent of his capacity".

A range of Tingo-branded soft drinks was launched at a Lagos event in April 2024, "produced by Tingo BV PLC, a spin-off company from Ojaja Pan Africa Limited". As founder of Tingo Foods, Mmobuosi was present at the launch, hosted by the Ooni (traditional ruler of Ife), Adeyeye Enitan Ogunwusi, Ojaja II, and welcomed plans to distribute the products through Ojaja Malls.

In September 2024, a US district court in New York ordered Mmobuosi and his three entities to pay a fine of $250mn as final judgement by default after his defence failed to make any representation or provide documents against the civil complaint filed by the SEC. Mmobuosi did not enter into any plea or defend the case in court. However, after the verdict, he insisted the SEC had made baseless and outrageous accusations against him and Tingo, aware that the defendants lacked the financial resources to mount a rigorous defence. He also said the SEC had ignored critical evidence, notably a report from the Nigerian inspector general of police that, Mmobuosi said, verified the legitimacy of Tingo's operations.

In August 2025, the US Securities and Exchange Commission (SEC) announced a settled enforcement action against Nigerian auditor Olayinka Temitope Oyebola and his accounting firm, Olayinka Oyebola & Co., for their role in the Tingo Group case. The SEC's complaint, to which the defendants consented without admitting or denying the allegations, stated that Oyebola and his firm discovered that Tingo executives had fabricated audit reports with Oyebola's signature for regulatory filings. According to the SEC, rather than reporting this, they assisted in concealing the fraud by making material misstatements to a subsequent auditor. The final judgment imposed permanent injunctions, a six-year suspension from practicing before the SEC, and a total of $200,000 in civil penalties. The action against the external auditor was part of the broader legal fallout from the SEC's case against Tingo Group and its founder, Dozy Mmobuosi. As one example cited in the SEC's complaint, Tingo's 2022 annual report claimed a bank balance of $461.7 million, while records allegedly showed the true balance was less than $50.

In December 2024, it was reported that Tingo Group had ceased activities, with its website up for sale; Tingo Mobile had reportedly laid off 40 contractors in February 2024, some of whom had not been paid since December 2023, and furloughed nearly all its full-time employees in March 2024.

== Tingo Group subsidiaries ==
- Tingo Mobile was an Agri-Fintech company providing a smartphone platform service to empower a marketplace to allow subscribers/farmers within and outside of the agricultural sector to manage their commercial activities of growing and selling their production to market participants both domestically and internationally. Tingo connected farmers to markets, services, and resources via Nwassa, its digital AgriTech marketplace platform, which commenced operations in April 2021.
- Tingo Food offered food processing and production services in Lagos, Nigeria. It was founded by Dozy Mmobuosi with Neha Mehta as the CEO.
- Tingo DMCC operated a commodities trading platform and commodity export business, connecting farmers and buyers around the world to facilitate fair trade and market access.
- In partnership with Visa, TingoPay Super-App provided payment services, e-wallet, and a range of services to its customers, as well as merchant services to businesses.

== Tingo-branded ventures (2025) ==
In February 2025, Mmobuosi announced an AI-driven platform intended to transform African agriculture by offering farmers tools for crop monitoring, predictive analytics, and supply chain optimisation; TingoGPT was officially launched in Los Angeles in April 2025. Also in February 2025, Mmobuosi launched Tingo AI Radio 102.5 FM in Lagos.
