= Louis-Alexandre Bottée =

French engraver and medallist

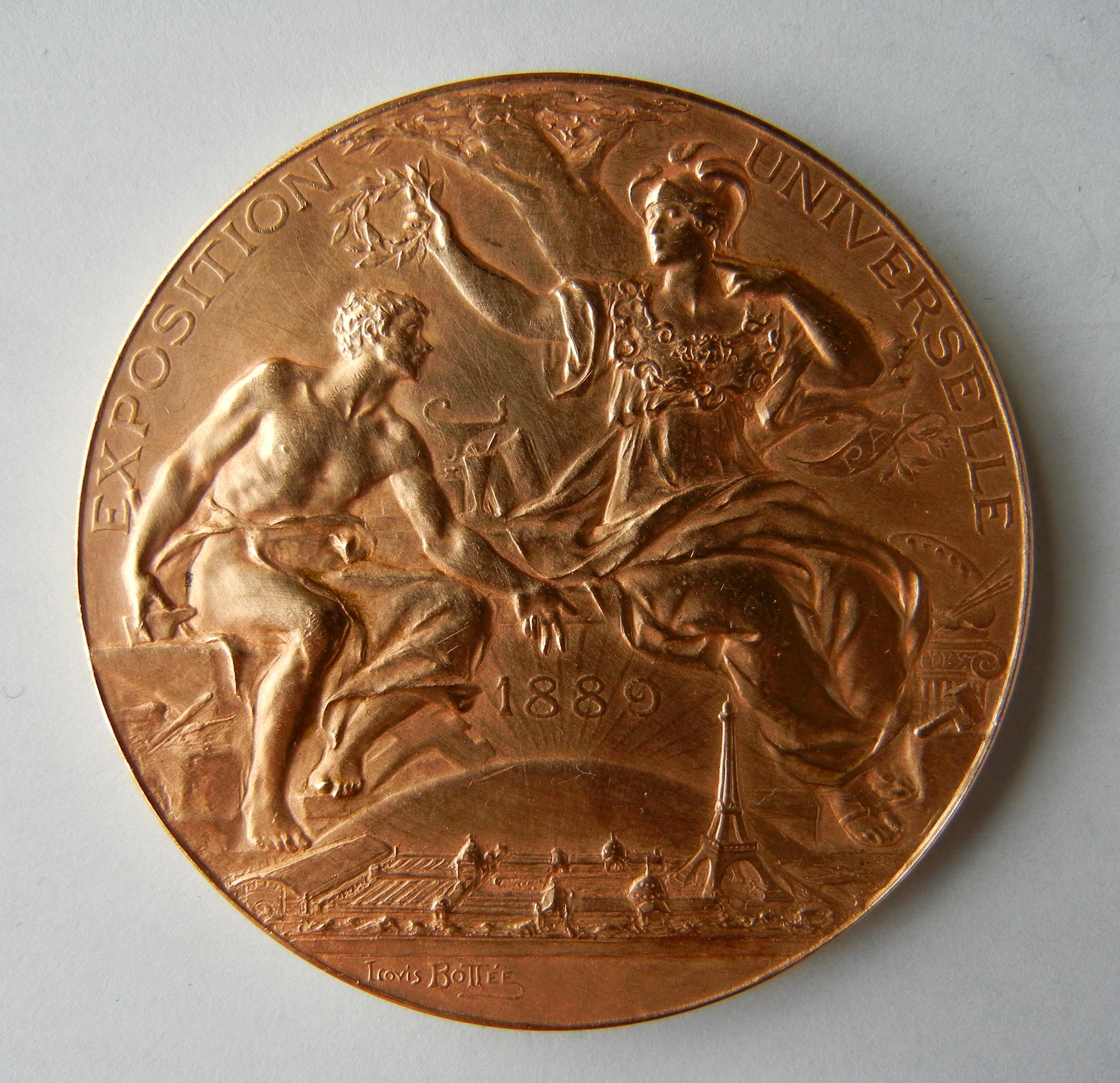
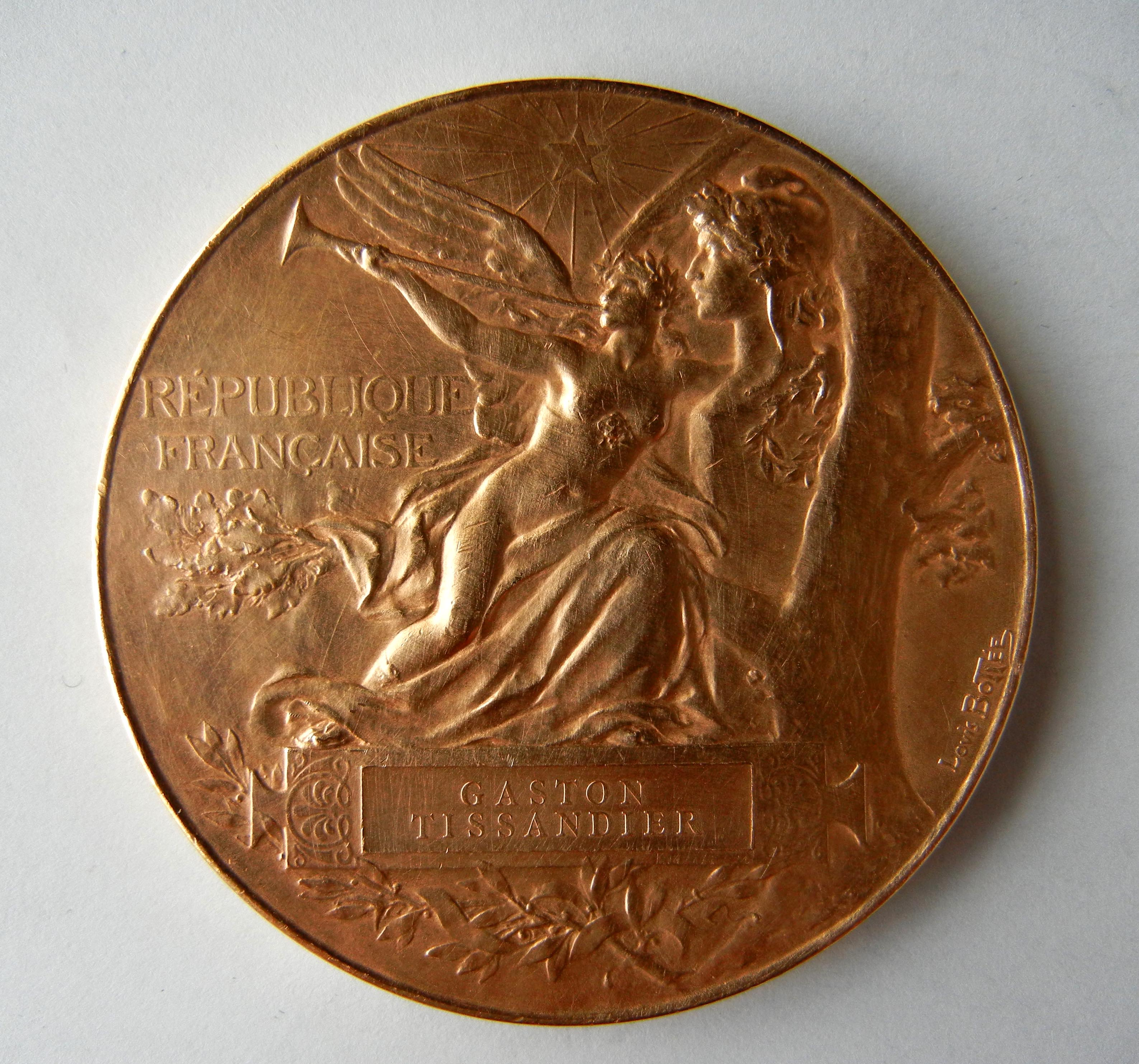
Medal awarded to Gaston Tissandier at the Exposition Universelle (1889)

Louis-Alexandre Bottée (14 March 1852, Paris - 14 November 1940, Paris) was a French engraver and medallist.

== Life and work ==
Born to a poor family, he began an apprenticeship at a button factory in 1865, where he was in charge of engraving the models. Four years later, he was attending the École des Arts Décoratifs, where he studied in the workshops of Paulin Tasset.

He was accepted at the École des Beaux-Arts in 1871. where his primary instructor was Hubert Ponscarme. In 1876, he visited Italy, and would return there after winning the Prix de Rome of 1878, for medal and fine stone engraving. From 1880 to 1882, he was at the Villa Medici in Rome.

In 1900, he received a gold medal at the Salon. Many of his works were in Art Nouveau style, such as the plaques for the jury at the Exposition Universelle of 1900, made by the goldsmithing and silverware firm of Christofle.

He was named a Knight in the Legion of Honor in 1898, and became an Officer in 1903. In 1930, he was elected to the Académie des Beaux-Arts, where he took Seat #3 for engraving; succeeding Henri-Auguste Patey (deceased).
