= Ortega Deniran =

Nigerian footballer

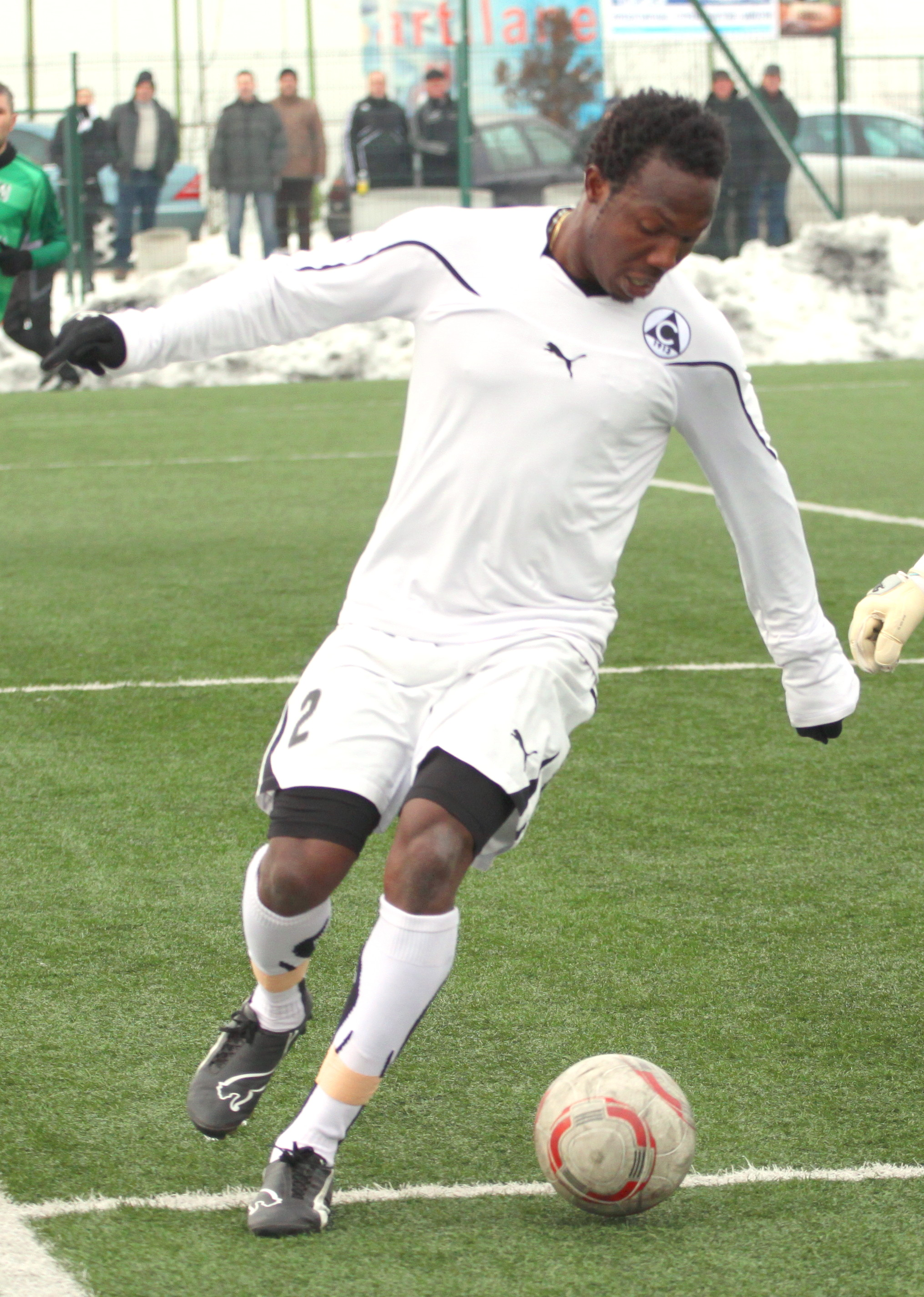

Personal information
- Full name: Ortega Deniran
- Date of birth: 28 May 1986 (age 40)
- Place of birth: Warri, Nigeria
- Height: 1.79 m (5 ft 10 in)
- Position: Striker

Team information
- Current team: 1472 F.C. (manager)

Youth career
- 1996-2002: Inter Milan Lagos

Senior career*
| Years | Team | Apps | (Gls) |
| 2002–2003 | Alacranes Rojos de Apatzingán | 12 | (7) |
| 2003–2004 | Lagartos de Tabasco | | |
| 2004–2005 | CD Suchitepéquez | 28 | (9) |
| 2006 | Chongqing Lifan | 13 | (1) |
| 2007 | Spartak Varna | 10 | (2) |
| 2007–2011 | Slavia Sofia | 32 | (12) |
| 2009 | → Levski Sofia (loan) | 7 | (3) |
| 2010 | → FC Banants (loan) | 20 | (7) |
| 2012–2013 | Dolphins | | |
| 2013–2017 | Edinburgh City | | |

Managerial career
- 2021: Warri Wolves
- 2022: Sporting Lagos
- 2023–: 1472 F.C.
- * Club domestic league appearances and goals as of 1 May 2012

Ortega Deniran (born 28 May 1986) is a Nigerian professional football manager and former player.

== Playing career ==
Between 2004 and 2005, he was in Guatemala and played in the local team CD Suchitepéquez. In Apertura 2004–05 season he played in 11 matches and scored 4 goals. In Clausura 2004–05 season he played in 17 matches and scored 5 goals.

In June 2006, Deniran signed for Chongqing Lifan. He joined Spartak in February 2007 on a free transfer. After six months in Spartak, he signed with Slavia Sofia in July 2007. On 23 July 2009 he joined Levski Sofia on loan. Deniran scored his first two goals for Levski on 8 August 2009 against Botev Plovdiv. The result of the match was 5:0 with a home win for Levski. In 2010, he moved to Armenian side FC Banants. In 2011, he returned to Slavia. After leaving Slavia he returned to Nigeria to play for Dolphins in 2012, following a move to Scotland in 2013, where he played for Edinburgh City. He gained promotion into the Scottish League Two after spending three seasons with the team, two of which were in the newly formed fifth tier of Scottish football.

== Coaching career ==
Deniran started his coaching career with Edinburgh City as a backroom coaching staff, supporting the head coach. During his time with Edinburgh City the team won the Lowland League title in 2014–15 and 2015–16. They then gained promotion to the Scottish Professional Football League. In 2017 Ortega Deniran joined Enyimba F.C., a team playing in the Nigeria Professional Football League, as an Assistant Coach. Following a successful season with Enyimba F.C., he was appointed as a third Assistant of the Head Coach of the Nigeria national under-20 football team. With Ortega Deniran part of the coaching staff, the team became runners-up in the 2018 WAFU Cup of Nations and qualified for the 2019 U-20 Africa Cup of Nations. In the tournament they won the bronze medal, taking them to the 2019 FIFA U-20 World Cup.

== Honours ==
Player

With CD Suchitepéquez.

- Liga Nacional Runner-up: Clausura 2004–05

With Levski Sofia.

- Bulgarian Supercup: 2009

With FC Banants.

- Armenian Supercup Runner-up: 2010

With Edinburgh City

- Lowland Football League: 2014-15, 2015–16

Coach

With Nigeria national under-20 football team.

- WAFU Cup of Nations: 2018

With Nigeria national under-20 football team.

- U-20 Africa Cup of Nations Runner-up: 2019
