= Kola Aluko =

Nigerian businessman (born 1969)

- Born: Kolawole Aluko; 20 October 1969 (age 56); Lagos, Western Region, Nigeria (Lagos, Nigeria)
- Education: Igbogbi College Lagos
- Occupation: Businessman
- Parent: Chief Akanni Aluko

Kola Aluko (born 20 October 1969), is a Nigerian businessman with interests in African infrastructure development and aviation. Formerly based in Nigeria, Aluko was the Co-Chief Officer and executive director of Atlantic Energy, an indigenous, private upstream oil and gas company, focused on independent exploration and production in Nigeria.

Kola Aluko was ranked among the Forty Richest Africans by Forbes Africa in 2012, and in 2013 was among the Top Ten Successful African Entrepreneurs to Follow on Twitter. New African magazine (November 2013 issue) included Aluko in their 100 Most Influential Africans listing.

== Background ==
Born Kolawole Aluko Lagos, Nigeria, on 20 October 1969, one of nine siblings. Aluko's mother is a pharmacist, and his father, Chief Akanni Aluko Chairman of Island Club and High Chief in Ilesha, Osun State, Nigeria a geologist.

Chief Akanni Aluko is the only child of Mrs Adedoja Aluko from Ogbomosho, Oyo State, Nigeria. Kola Aluko attended Igbogbi College in Lagos. Aluko says, he was "from an early age very ambitious and I always knew I wanted to work for myself". “Highly competitive and keen on sports”, Aluko's entrepreneurial mindset saw him work in different industries, from pharmaceuticals to cars, before settling for the oil industry in the early 1990s.

== Business career ==
Kola Aluko co-founded Besse Oil, a pioneering oil trading company in Nigeria in 1995. Besse Oil, one of the first to obtain a credit line with major international banks, traded crude oil and fuel oil, and was also a major importer of gasoline.

Six years later, in 2001, Aluko founded Fossil Resources, an indigenous downstream oil and gas company, where he held the role of CEO.

In 2004, Kola Aluko formed Exoro Energy International, became CEO and moved into exploration and production. Exoro Energy partnered with a division of Weatherford, to showcase its exploration and production technology.

In 2007, the division of Weatherford was bought out and merged with Exoro Energy to form an independent company, Seven Energy.

Kola Aluko, with a team of Nigerian and international E&P executives, co-founded Atlantic Energy in 2011, a private upstream oil and gas company, with an increased focus on under-developed producing fields in Nigeria. In partnership with the Nigerian Petroleum Development Company (NPDC) Atlantic Energy focused mainly on Niger Delta assets, contracted and executed under Strategic Alliance Agreements (SAAs) with the NPDC.

== Other interests ==
Kola Aluko is a co-founder of the Made in Africa Foundation (MiAF). It was established in 2011 (and incorporated in the UK in March 2012) by English fashion designer Oswald Boateng, Aluko and Atlantic Energy to support transformational and large scale African developments and infrastructure projects. Chris Cleverly (a cousin of UK Conservative MP and minister James Cleverly) was CEO of the foundation, and oversaw day-to-day operations; Boateng and Aluko were trustees and Atlantic Energy executive Dayo Okusami was a director of the foundation. On 26 September 2013, MiAF launched the Africa50 fund at New York's NASDAQ, Africa's largest infrastructure investment vehicle to date. MiAF, in alliance with the African Development Bank (AfDB), aimed to raise US$500 million for Africa50 by early 2014. The two institutions were supported by the investment expertise of Capri Global Capital - a US-based investment advisory founded by African-American fund manager Quintin E. Primo III.

Aluko, who is based in Nigeria and Switzerland, is a passionate motor sports enthusiast, who races and competes in conjunction with Swiss-based Ferrari team Kessel Racing. In December 2012, Aluko and his Kessel teammates Thomas Kemenater and Maurizio Mediani came third in the final round of the Endurance Champions Cup held at Rome's Vallelunga Circuit in Italy.

In interviews Aluko often cites the racing car driver Ayrton Senna as a main inspiration, drawing parallels between racing, business and life in general. When asked on his advice for young entrepreneurs, Aluko said, “The key is focus, focus and again focus. Identify the things you are good at, your strengths, and get to work on your weaknesses. The racing car driver Ayrton Senna, a man who inspired me greatly, is a good example. Senna was an exceptional driver, however, initially he was terrible in wet conditions, compared to racing in the dry. But he identified his weakness, and so every time it rained, he jumped into his car, and practiced, practiced, practiced, until he arguably became the best, wet weather driver in history."

== Controversies ==
In 2017, Aluko, co businessman Jide Omokore and former Nigeria Petroleum Minister Diezani Alison-Madueke were being investigated for a series of multibillion-dollar fraud and money laundering offences in Nigeria, the United Kingdom and America. Between 2015 and 2017 Aluko sold a portion of his substantial overseas real estate holdings and the U.S. Department of Justice filed a civil complaint seeking the forfeiture and recovery of approximately $144 million in assets alleged to be proceeds of corruption offenses laundered in the United States. However, Aluko has not been convicted of any crimes in relation to these allegations. In Nigeria, the case filed against him was subsequently dismissed by the court for lack of evidence, and he was not found guilty of the charges.
