= Rejina Pyo =

South Korean fashion designer

Rejina Pyo is a South Korean fashion designer.

She was born and grew up in Seoul, South Korea.

Pyo launched her eponymous fashion brand in 2014. As of 2020, there are more than 100 stockists worldwide.

People to have worn her clothes include Leandra Medine, Eva Chen, Kate Foley, and Meghan Markle.

Fo London Fashion Week, spring/summer 2022 in September 2021 her show was held at the London Aquatics Centre.

Her designs are sold at Ingie Chalhoub's Etoile La Boutique.
