= Musée Bouilhet-Christofle =

Defunct French private museum

Coordinates: 48°52′4″N 2°19′21″E

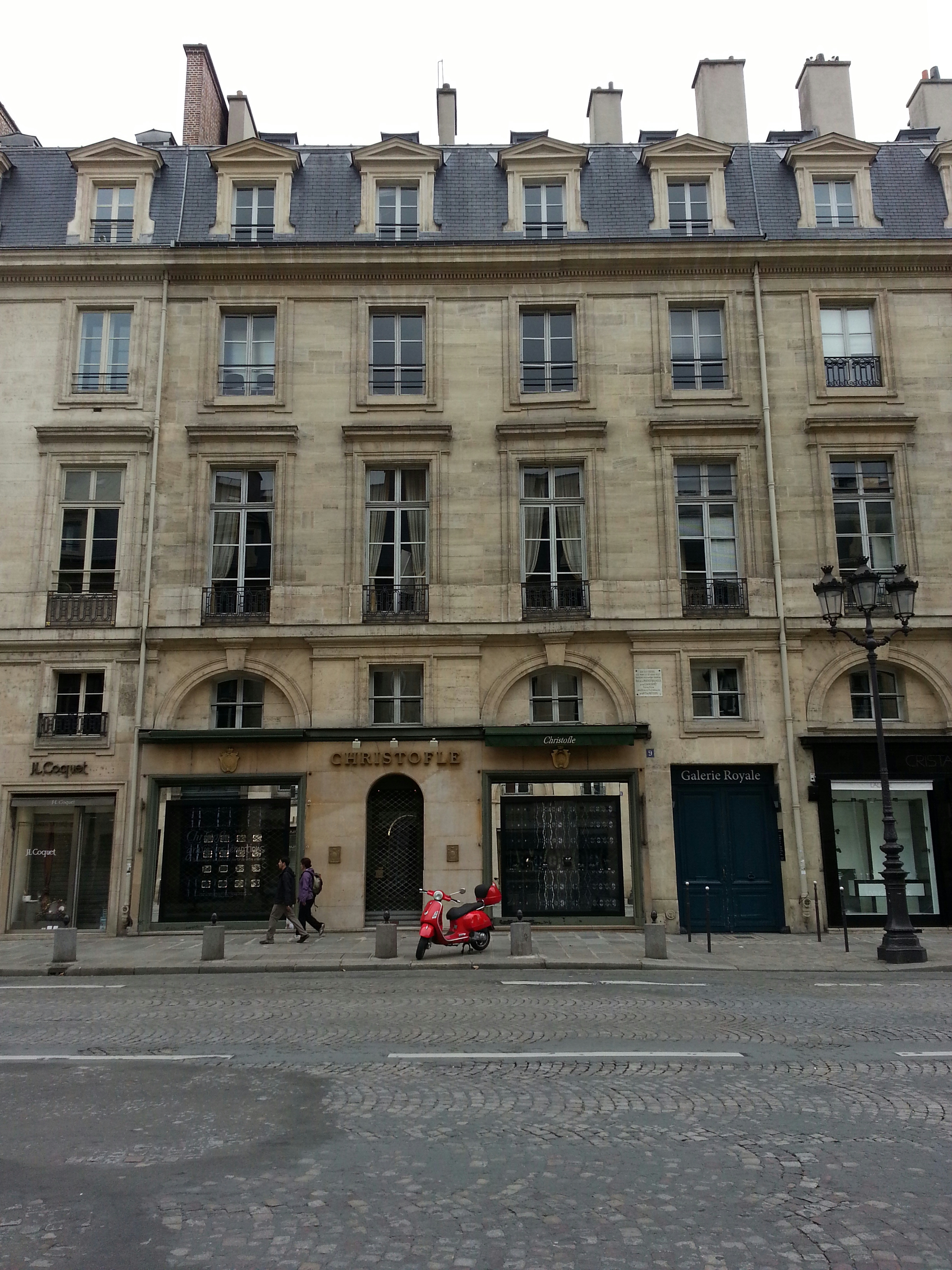
Exterior of 9, rue Royale, Paris

Musée Bouilhet-Christofle was a French private museum located in the 8th arrondissement at 9, rue Royale, Paris, France. The museum's main collection was located in a Parisian suburb at 112, rue Ambroise Croizat, Saint-Denis, France. The museum closed in 2008. It was one of two museums of the Christofle company, along with the museum in Saint-Denis, which closed the same year.

Maison Christofle was founded in 1830 by Charles Christofle (1805–1863), becoming silversmith to Emperor Napoleon III and one of the major silversmiths in nineteenth-century France. The museum contained more than 2,000 items of silver plate and cutlery, reflecting the company's history from its founding to recent times.

The museum displayed examples of naturalism, Orientalism, Japonism, Art Nouveau, items produced for the universal expositions, Art Deco and other styles. In addition, it documented a wide range of techniques, including electroplating and enameling. The museum also contained displays about the history of silver production, table settings and table manners.

== See also ==
- List of museums in Paris
