= Shalhoub =

Shalhoub (شلهوب) is an Arabic surname of primarily Levantine origin. Notable people with the surname include:

- Tony Shalhoub (born 1953), Lebanese-American actor
- Mohammad Al-Shalhoub (born 1980), Saudi Arabian soccer player
- Nadera Shalhoub-Kevorkian, Israeli-Palestinian feminist scholar

== See also ==
- Michael Shalhoub
- Chalhoub
