= Made in Africa Foundation =

Economic development organization

Made In Africa Foundation is an organisation established in 2011 to assist development of the African continent by providing first-stage funding for feasibility studies and business development of large-scale infrastructure projects based in the region.

Made in Africa Foundation engaged with governments, multilateral organisations such as the World Bank, financial institutions, and private investors, to advocate for the continent and the foundation's supported projects, and raise awareness of economic changes taking place in Africa. Originally a UK-based foundation, it is now incorporated in Uganda.

== History ==
The foundation was a spin-off of the for-profit Made in Africa, which had been founded by Savile Row tailor Ozwald Boateng, a Ugandan prince Hassan Kimbugwe, and barrister Chris Cleverly in 2005.

In 2007, Made in Africa supported an African Union banquet co-hosted with Ghana's president and AU Chairperson John Kofi Kufor and attended by 53 African heads of state. At the banquet, Rev. Jesse Jackson gave a speech written by Cleverly (a highlight of the speech was later included in a Made in Africa Foundation film The Tipping Point). In 2010, Made in Africa supported a London conference, 'Joining up Africa', hosted by the UK Department for International Development, and organised by the AU commission, African Development Bank (AfDB), the World Bank and other international agencies. At the event, Boateng urged international governments and agencies to provide more support for African entrepreneurs and investments.

The foundation was established in 2011 (and incorporated in the UK in March 2012) by Boateng, Nigerian businessman Kola Aluko and Nigeria-based oil and gas company Atlantic Energy to support transformational and large scale African developments and infrastructure projects. Cleverly (a cousin of UK Conservative MP and minister James Cleverly) was CEO of the Made in Africa Foundation, and oversaw day-to-day operations; Boateng and Aluko were trustees and Atlantic Energy executive Dayo Okusami was a director of the foundation.

The foundation's mission was based on Boateng's statement: "It’s a well-known statistic that US$400 million of funding for feasibility studies and master plans across sub-Saharan Africa would develop over US$100 billion of infrastructure projects, which in turn would create a trillion dollars of value across Africa. The first step is often the hardest and we have created this Foundation with Atlantic Energy to make that step easier for Africans."

In a January 2013 BBC HARDtalk interview with Zeinab Badawi, Boateng discussed African diaspora returning to develop enterprises in the region, and urged more to do the same. Central to Made in Africa Foundation's objectives was to encourage and provide support for these individuals. The foundation considered African Americans – people of African origin – part of its definition of the African diaspora and central to Africa's growth story. (Made in Africa has previously linked with significant African American figures including Jamie Foxx, Chris Tucker, Mos Def, Isaiah Washington and Herbie Hancock.)

=== Our Future Made in Africa (2013) ===
Boateng and the Made in Africa Foundation were guest editors of the May 2013 issue of the pan-African magazine, New African. The issue coincided with the African Union's 50th anniversary, was titled Our Future Made in Africa - What Africans can do in the next 50 years, and included articles assessing Africa's past pitfalls and future possibilities. Contributors included Liberian and Gabonese presidents Ellen Johnson Sirleaf and Omar Bongo Ondimba, Mo Ibrahim, former UK Prime Minister Tony Blair, Director-General of UNIDO Kandeh Yumkella and British architect David Adjaye.

The New African issue coincided with a gala event, Our Future Made in Africa, in Marrakech, Morocco, organised in collaboration with the African Banker Awards and supported by Atlantic Energy. The event featured a fashion show, the African banker awards, performances from John Legend, Akon, Youssou N'dour and Mos Def, and the premiere of a Made In Africa Foundation film, Our Future Made in Africa, featuring Boateng, The event was intended to fundraise and get support for the AfDB's programme of infrastructure development projects; as a result, the Made in Africa Foundation signed a co-operation agreement with the Obasanjo Foundation, founded by former Nigerian president Olusegun Obasanjo. AfDB president Donald Kaberuka received an award from the Made in Africa Foundation for his efforts to transform Africa.

Made in Africa Foundation worked with the AfDB on their programme for infrastructure development in Africa (PIDA). The PIDA initiative aimed to further the socio-economic development of Africans, by improving the continent's nascent power, transportation, water, and ICT infrastructure. The programme comprised over 50 projects to be implemented between 2012 and 2040. Made in Africa Foundation aimed to assist in raising foreign investment and greater public awareness, and CEO Chris Cleverly launched the billion dollar Africa50 fund with Emmanuel Mbi, COO of AfDB on 14 June 2013; the fund was then formally launched at Nasdaq on 30 September 2013. The Africa50 fund has launched numerous power projects across Africa.

The foundation was dissolved in the UK in July 2015. It is now incorporated in Uganda where it is focused on agriculture projects.
