= Tiger Group =

Real estate company in UAE

- Type: Private
- Industry: Real estate
- Founded: 1976; 50 years ago in Dubai, UAE
- Founder: Waleed Mohammad AlZoubi
- Headquarters: UAE
- Website: Tiger Group

Tiger Group is a group of companies headquartered in Dubai, UAE. The business was named the Top 100 Arab Family Businesses in the Middle East and Top Real Estate Companies in the Arab World by Forbes.

== History ==
Tiger Group was founded in 1976 by the Syrian engineer Waleed Mohammad AlZoubi.

It started in 1976 in the construction field through Tiger Contracting Company, and since then, the company has expanded its operations to Gulf Region, the Middle East, and Turkey.

Tiger Group currently includes companies such as Tiger Contracting, Tiger International General Contracting, Tiger Properties, Tiger Industries, Al Durah Contracting, Al Durah Foundation, Al-Waleed Commerce, DubaiLink Tours, Dana Hotel Management, and Samaya Hotels & Resorts.

In March 2022, Tiger Group launched its new project, the Cloud Tower, in Dubai, with investments valued at $109 million. In April 2022, the Group donated $1.6 million to support the #1BillionMeals initiative.

In 2024, Tiger Group's real estate arm Tiger Properties announced Tiger Sky Tower, a billion-dollar residential tower in Dubai. According to Tiger Group the project will have the highest rainforest in a residential building, the highest sky restaurant, an infinity pool, a roller coaster adventure and the highest penthouse in the world.

In 2025, Tiger Group's real estate arm Tiger Properties announced "Tiger Downtown Ajman" a $10 billion project in Ajman.

== Community development ==
Tiger Group has established Al Yarmouk Private University and Al Yarmouk Schools in Syria in addition to multiple schools in Syria, Jordan, and Turkey.

In 2020, the company launched hospitality and residential projects in collaboration with the University of Freiburg, Germany, and other MENA countries all over the UAE.

In 2021, Tiger Group donated AED1 million to the '100 Million Meals' campaign, the first humanitarian campaign in the Arab world to provide food parcels for disadvantaged individuals and families across 30 countries in the Middle East, Asia, Africa, Europe, and South America during the Holy Month of Ramadan.

In 2022, Tiger Group donated AED 6 million to the '1 Billion Meals' campaign which intended to assist and provide sustainable food support to underprivileged communities in 50 countries.
