= Ozwald Boateng =

British fashion designer (born 1967)

Ozwald Boateng OBE
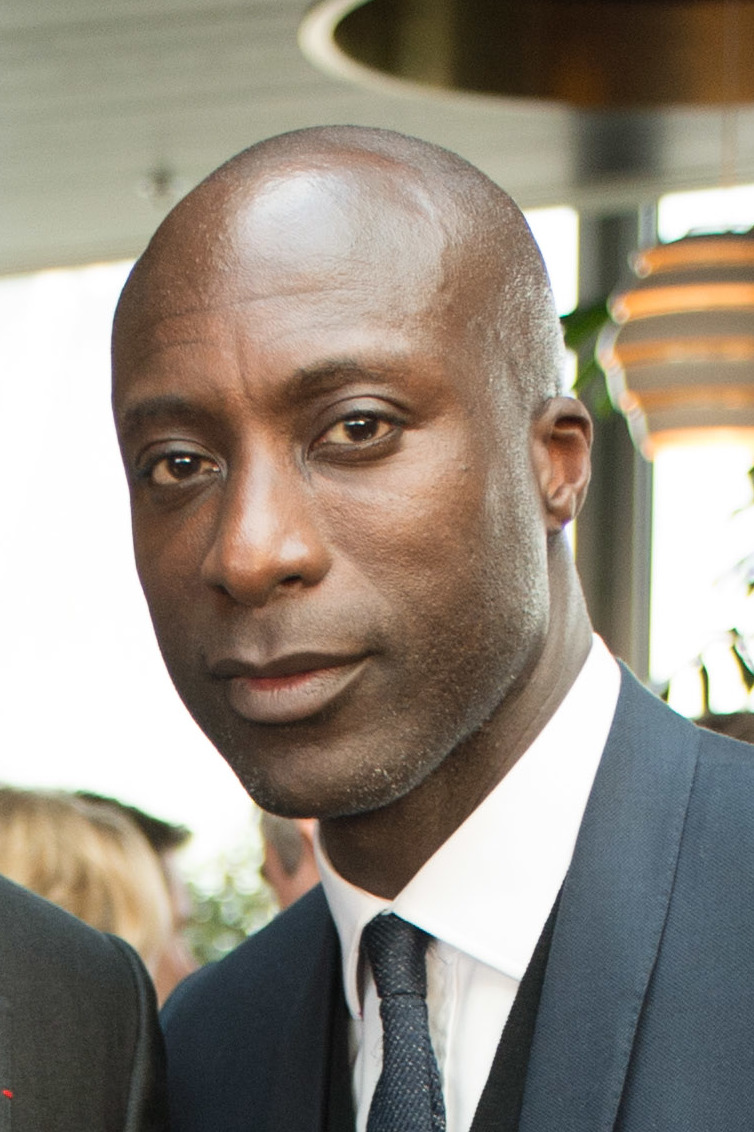
- Boateng in June 2015
- Born: 28 February 1967 (age 59); Muswell Hill, London, England
- Occupation: Fashion designer
- Children: 2

Ozwald Boateng, OBE (/ˈɒzwəld ˈboʊtɛŋ/; born 28 February 1967) is an English fashion designer, best known for his trademark twist on classic tailoring and bespoke styles.

== Early life ==
Boateng was born in the Muswell Hill district of London on 28 February 1967, the son of Ghanaian immigrants. He was inspired by the immaculate suits his father wore, and received his first suit—a double-breasted outfit in purple mohair—from his mother when he was eight years old. At the age of 14, he found a summer job sewing linings into suits. While studying computer science at Southwark College, 16-year-old Boateng was introduced to cutting and designing by his then-girlfriend.

Using his mother's old sewing machine, he started designing and selling to his fellow students and soon switched studies to graduate in fashion and design. He helped a friend make clothes for a fashion show, and after receiving praise for his work, he sold his first collection to a menswear shop in Covent Garden. Subsequent sales enabled him to open his first studio in Portobello Road in 1991. He staged his first catwalk presentation during the 1994 Paris Fashion Week, becoming the first tailor to stage a catwalk show in Paris.

== Career ==
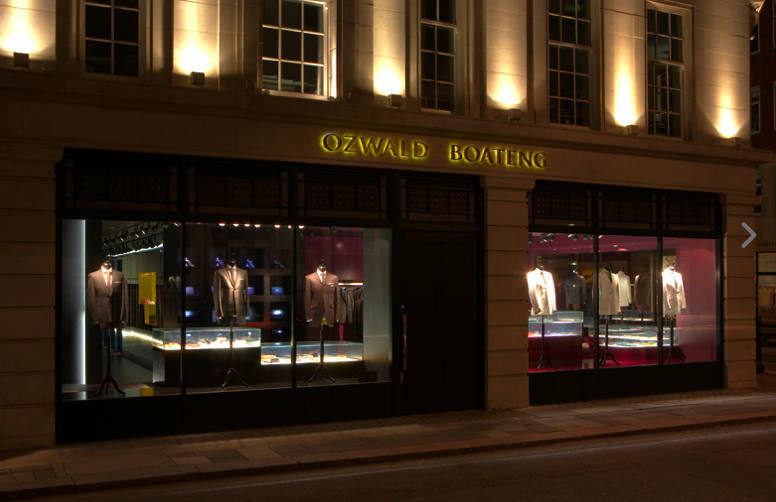
Boateng's Flagship Store, No. 30 Savile Row

Mentored by Tommy Nutter, the success of the Paris show in 1994 enabled Boateng to open his boutique on Vigo Street, the south end of Savile Row, in 1995.

Boateng's contemporary approach to menswear design helped to forge a new appreciation for Savile Row, and draw in a younger demographic. Boateng's moved fully into Savile Row in June 2002.

In 2003, Boateng launched a new product in perfumes for women. Bespoke comprises two different vials of fragrance within an elongated, jewel-like bottle.

In 2005, Boateng was honoured with a major 20-year retrospective event at the Victoria and Albert Museum.

In 2008, Boateng's new flagship store and headquarters are launched at No. 30 Savile Row, on the corner of Savile Row and Clifford Street. The largest store on this Mayfair street, as of November 2019, its signs and interiors were co-designed with British-Ghanaian Architect David Adjaye. As of November 2019 it remains the only Black-owned store on Savile Row, and has since 2010 been managed by Moroccan-born Bespoke manager, Khalid Fakhour.

In 2007, Boateng merged the corporate headquarters of his company with his redesigned flagship store on Savile Row. In addition to a bespoke service, Boateng also produces two ready-to-wear collections a year, produced at the former Chester Barrie factory in Crewe, Cheshire.

== Collaborations ==
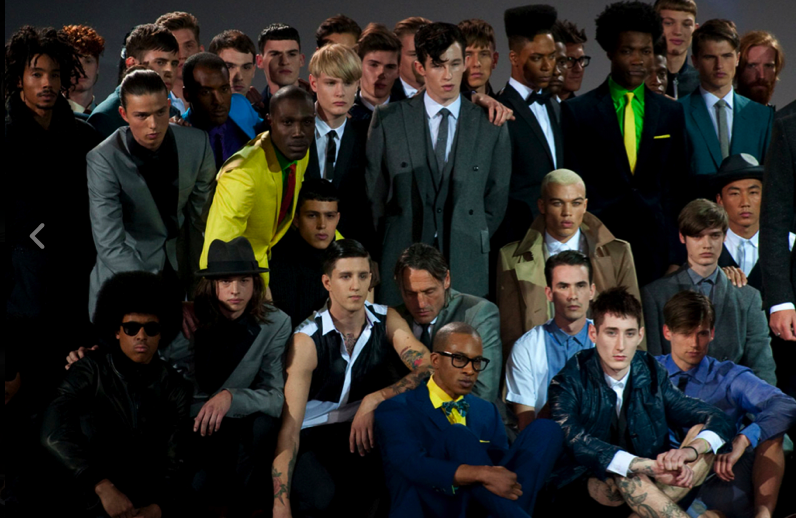
Boateng's show at London Fashion Week, 2010

LVMH President Bernard Arnault appointed Boateng Creative Director of Menswear at French Fashion house Givenchy. In a 2019 interview with Icon Mann," Boateng reveals that back then his "challenge [had been] to reinvent the French gentleman," and that "he [had] succeeded in doing so." His first collection was shown in July 2004 in Paris, at Hotel de Ville. Boateng parted with Givenchy after the Spring 2007 collection.

In 2004, Coutts approached Boateng to design a new Super-Premium credit card. The Coutts "World Credit Card" appears in Boateng's trademark imperial purple, designed to communicate a new modernity and supreme elegance.

In 2004, Boateng designed new amenity kits for Virgin Atlantic's Upper Class. Critically claimed to be the most stylish first-class kits available to travellers on any airline, the design increased pick rate fivefold.

Boateng was commissioned by John Agyekum Kufuor, President of the Republic of Ghana, to design and orchestrate a show at the ninth annual African Union summit in 2007. Held in Accra, it coincided with 200 years since the cessation of the transatlantic slave trade, and 50 years of independence for Ghana.

In 2018 British Airways confirmed that Boateng had been chosen as the designer for its new uniform, to be launched as part of the organisation's centenary celebrations. This appointment was a matter of controversy amongst customers of the airline and staff alike, who had come to believe that the new uniform would be designed in partnership with the British brand Burberry. After 4 years of painstaking work with departments throughout the airline to consider the needs of those who would wear the uniform, Boateng's "British Airways x Ozwald Boateng" collection was launched by British Airways in 2023 in the midst of the airline's "A British Original" campaign.

== Film and television ==
Boateng has designed bespoke costumes for films and TV shows including Mo' Better Blues, Hannibal, Lock, Stock and Two Smoking Barrels, Tomorrow Never Dies, Sex and the City, Ugly Betty, Eastern Promises, Gangster Number One, Alfie, Assault on Precinct 13, The Matrix, Miami Vice, Oceans 13, and Rush Hour 3.

Director Varon Bonicos filmed Boateng between 1998 and 2010 for a fly-on-the-wall feature documentary called A Man's Story, released in March 2012.

On 22 June 2006, the Sundance Channel and Reveille LLC released an eight-part real life documentary series called House of Boateng, tracking the journey of Boateng as he embarks on the expansion of his brand in the United States. The series was produced by Robert Redford and Ben Silverman.

As well as design, Boateng has created and directed film projects of his own.

- 1994: Debut show – his first venture into film alongside his Paris Catwalk show, a short movie dramatising the events and struggles leading up to the show.
- 2004: Arizona – First directorial debut, a short film entitled Catching Dreams, based in the Grand Canyon area. Shown at his debut show in Milan.
- 2004: Florence – A film released at the Pitti Imagine in Florence, chronicling the past 10 years of his life.
- 2004: Givenchy – a Japanese style manga style animation at his debut show as Creative Director for Givenchy.
- 2005: China – The short movie No Boundaries is filmed in the Guilin District of China. Shown at second show for Givenchy. It premieres at the Tremblant Film Festival in 2006, Canada, and comes second in the Short Film category.
- 2009: Why Style Matters – In collaboration with BBC4, a documentary on the significance of Savile Row in the 21st century and the renewed interest in Tailoring. Features Giorgio Armani.
- 2013: Our Future Made in Africa

== Personal life ==
Boateng has said that his mantra is, "If you flow with history and don't fight with it, eventually it becomes a dance."

Boateng has an ex-wife named Pascale, though their wedding and divorce dates are unknown. He later married Azerbaijani fashion model Gyunel Taylor at an unknown date, and they had two children named Emilia and Oscar together before divorcing in 2009. Emilia also became a model and signed with Storm Management.

== Charity ==
In 2008, Boateng was appointed to the REACH committee, as part of an independent panel to identify and recruit national role models who work to help raise aspirations of black boys.

Boateng, alongside Kola Aluko in partnership with Atlantic Energy, founded Made in Africa Foundation, a UK non-profit organisation established to assist the development of the African continent, by providing first-stage funding for feasibility studies and business development of large-scale infrastructure projects based in the region. The foundation was established on the basis of “reframing the dialogue and perception of Africa”, with the principals signing an agreement with the African Development Bank."

Featured as a 2018 special guest panellist at the London Business School African summit, addressing business on the continent, Boateng took part initialling a massive art collaboration Remember To Rise.
