= A Man's Story =

- Directed by: Varon Bonicos
- Produced by: Alastair Clark; Rachel Robey
- Cinematography: Varon Bonicos
- Edited by: Tom Hemmings
- Production company: Wellington Films
- Distributed by: Trinity Filmed Entertainment
- Release dates: October 2010 (Abu Dhabi Film Festival); 9 March 2012
- Running time: 98 minutes
- Country: United Kingdom
- Language: English

A Man's Story is a 2010 documentary film which explores the career of London fashion designer Ozwald Boateng. It was directed by Varon Bonicos.
