= G 57 =

The G-57 is a pressure group of Nigerian professionals who came into being as a result of the constitutional crisis that engulfed Nigeria in the wake of the flawed elections of 2007 which brought President Umaru Musa Yar'adua to power. Initially it was called G-53. It was soon expanded to include other pro democratic Nigerians and changed its name to G-57. The group gained national and international prominence after it called for the resignation of President Umaru Yar'adua after he was evacuated from Nigeria to Saudi Arabia on November 23, 2009 for a medical emergency without handing over executive powers to his vice, Dr. Goodluck Jonathan.The group also called for electoral reforms to guarantee free and fair elections in Africa's most populous country. After its first call for president Yar'adua's resignation on December, 2nd, 2009, the group called on the Nigerian Parliament to impeach president Yar'adua for multiple violations of the Nigerian constitution.

The major promoters of the G-57 are former Kaduna State governor, Alhaji Balarabe Musa and former presidential candidates, Chief Olu Falae and Professor Patrick Utomi in addition to Malam Nasir Ahmad El Rufai, a Nigerian reformist and former minister of the FCT (Federal Capital Territory), Abuja.

In 2011, the group which goes by the name of "G 57 Transparency Group", made headlines during the fuel subsidy crisis in Nigeria. The group had bought newspaper space in which they strongly criticized the Nigerian government.
