= Ruy de Sequeira =

Portuguese Explorer and Cartographer

Ruy de Sequeira (c. 1460 – c. 1530) was a Portuguese explorer, navigator, and cartographer during the Age of Discovery. He played a crucial role in expanding Portuguese influence, establishing trade routes, and contributing to the exploration of new territories.

== Life ==
Born around 1460 into a noble Portuguese family, Sequeira demonstrated an early passion for exploration and navigation. His exceptional skills in cartography and navigation quickly gained recognition among his peers and made him a valuable asset to the Portuguese expeditions.

During the historic voyage of Vasco da Gama to India in 1497, Sequeira guided the fleet through uncharted waters, maneuvering around treacherous obstacles. Sequeira's knowledge of currents, winds, and navigation techniques proved instrumental in the success of the expedition. During this journey, Sequeira also played a role in establishing Portuguese trading posts along the African and Indian coasts. These trading posts not only facilitated the lucrative spice trade with the East but also solidified Portugal's position as a major maritime power.

After the voyage to India, Sequeira continued to serve as a distinguished navigator and cartographer, participating in subsequent expeditions to the East. His cartographic skills produced detailed maps of the regions he explored, which became invaluable resources for future explorers and traders. Additionally, Sequeira played a crucial role in the exploration of Lagos, a bustling port city in Nigeria. He charted new routes and documented the coastal features of Lagos, contributing to its status as a significant hub for maritime trade. Sequeira's contributions to the exploration and mapping of both India and Lagos, Nigeria, have cemented his legacy as a pioneering figure in the Age of Discovery.

During his voyages, Sequeira' initiated contacts with local rulers, including the Oba of the Benin Empire. These interactions laid the foundation for limited trade between Portugal and the Benin Empire, a relationship that would later flourish and greatly impact European-African trade dynamics.
