= Paul Follot =

French designer

- Follot in 1927
- Born: 17 July 1877; Paris, France
- Died: 1941; Sainte-Maxime, Var, France
- Occupation: Decorator
- Known for: Pomone workshop of the Le Bon Marché

Paul Follot (17 July 1877 – 1941) was a French designer of luxury furniture and decorative art objects before World War I. He was one of the leaders of the Art Deco movement, and had huge influence in France and elsewhere. After the war he became head of the Pomone decorative art workshop of Le Bon Marché department store, making affordable but still elegant and high-quality work.

== Life ==
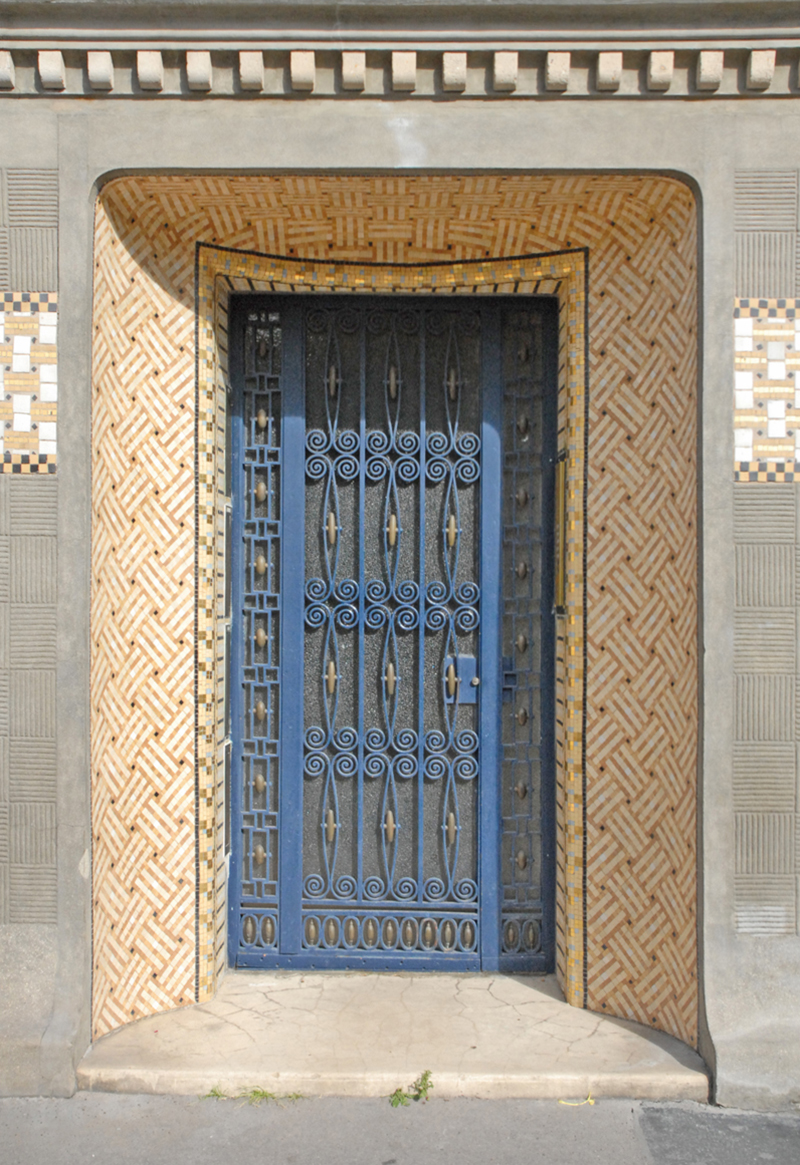
Art Nouveau entrance with ceramics of Follot's house built in 1911 at 5 rue Schoelcher, Paris

Paul Follot was born in 1877 in Paris. His father was the wallpaper manufacturer Félix Follot, of the Societé Charles Follot. Paul Follot trained as a sculptor. He became a student of Eugène Grasset. Between 1901 and 1903 he made Art Nouveau silver objects, textiles, bronzes and jewelry for Julius Meier-Graefe's Paris showroom La Maison Moderne. Maurice Dufrêne also worked for Meier-Graefe, and strongly influenced Follot. In 1903 Follot was a founding member of L'Art dans Tout (Art in Everything), a group of artists who strongly promoted French artisan work in the face of industrial products, particularly from Germany.

From 1910 Follot headed his own decorating company, catering to a wealthy clientele, and gained a reputation for quality and elegance. He made luxury furniture for his company. He designed textiles for Cornille et Cie, carpets for the Savonnerie manufactory and silver for Christofle throughout his career. In 1911 he made china designs for the Wedgwood company of England. Between 1910 and 1914 he designed new forms of jewelry. In 1913 he designed furniture for Germain Lubin in which the motif was the cornucopia. Follot also taught a course on decorative art for the city of Paris. Follot became one of the leaders of the Art Deco movement. He had huge influence beyond France and his style was often copied.

After World War I more of the large department stores began to operate workshops to make furniture and decorative art objects for the middle classes. In 1923 Follot took charge of the Pomone decorative art workshop of Le Bon Marché department store, which made affordable, good quality furniture and decorations. He designed the symbol of the workshop, a tree laden with fruit. The Pomone pavilion at the 1925 International Exposition of Modern Industrial and Decorative Arts in Paris was a great success. Follot had designed every room in the pavilion, and also contributed an antechamber to the exposition's model “Modern French Embassy.”

From 1928 Follot was a director of the Paris branch of Waring & Gillow, an English furniture company. In collaboration with Serge Chermayeff he introduced the motifs of fruit, garlands and cornucopia to the firm. Follot resumed an independent practice as a decorator in 1931. In 1935 he was commissioned to decorate the liner SS Normandie. That year he exhibited at the Brussels International Exposition.

Paul Follot died in 1941 in Sainte-Maxime.

== Style ==
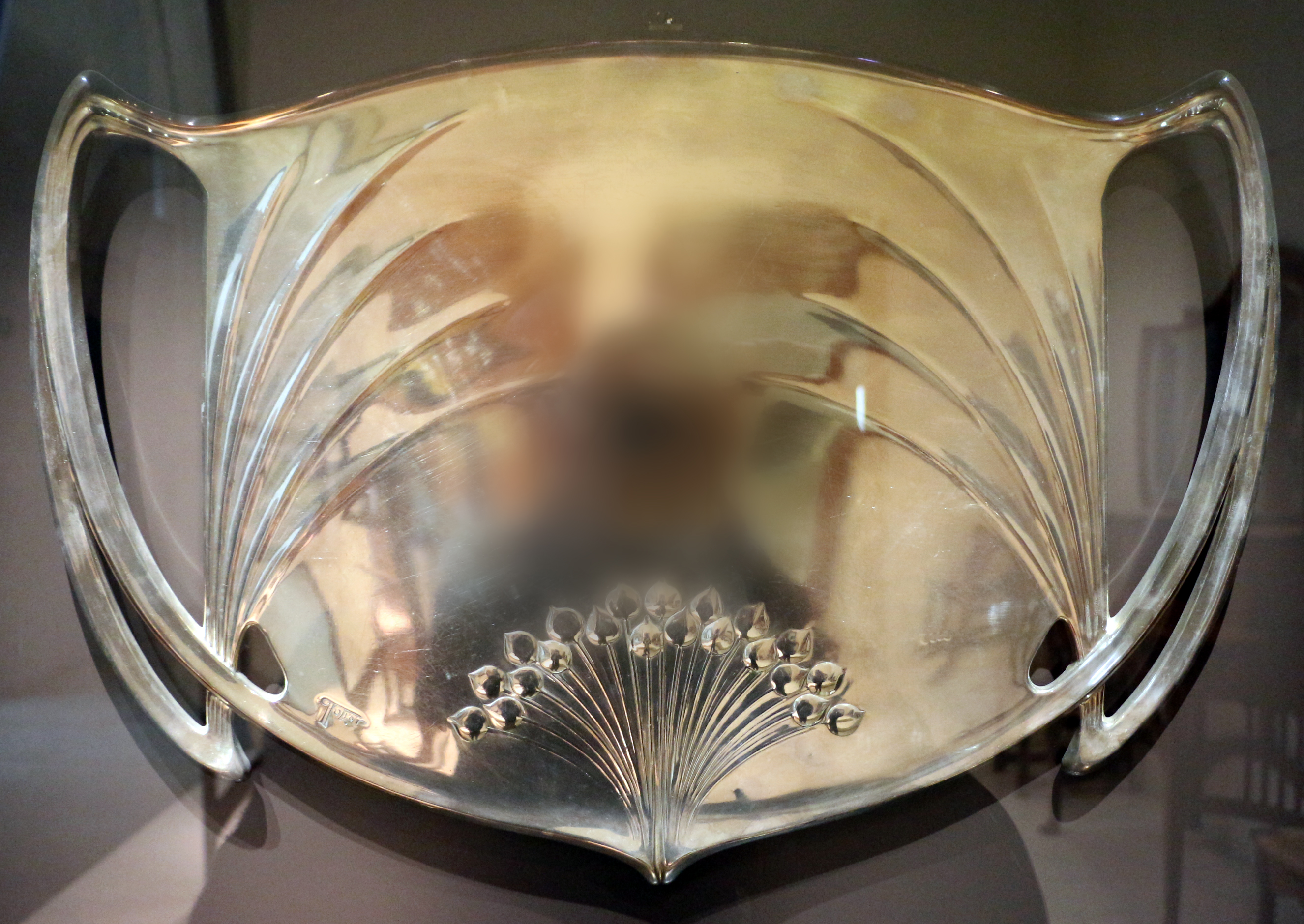
Tea tray for Christofle, 1903, Musée d'Orsay, Paris

Paul Follot's early designs reflect the Gothic Revival, with foliate motifs. Follot acquired a taste for wooden motifs and carvings from Grasset. The stylized motifs of baskets of fruit or of flowers were typically carved from solid wood by Laurent Malclès. Follot made well-upholstered pieces in gently curved and ornamented giltwood frames. He liked using rare materials, with inlays of contrasting colors and gilded bronze friezes. His furniture became closer to the styles of Louis XVI or of the Empire than to contemporary Art Nouveau.

After 1910 Follot's designs became quieter and more classical as his style evolved towards Art Deco. Follot's dining room ensemble in sycamore, ebony and amaranth, exhibited at the Salon d'Automne in 1912, is considered to be one of the first examples of Art Deco. It follows the precepts defined by André Vera in his manifesto L'Art décoratif of January 1912. The backs of the chairs in this set had an openwork design that represented a basket of fruit and flowers. Follot was an Art Deco "purist", and saw his work as refinement of classical French design.

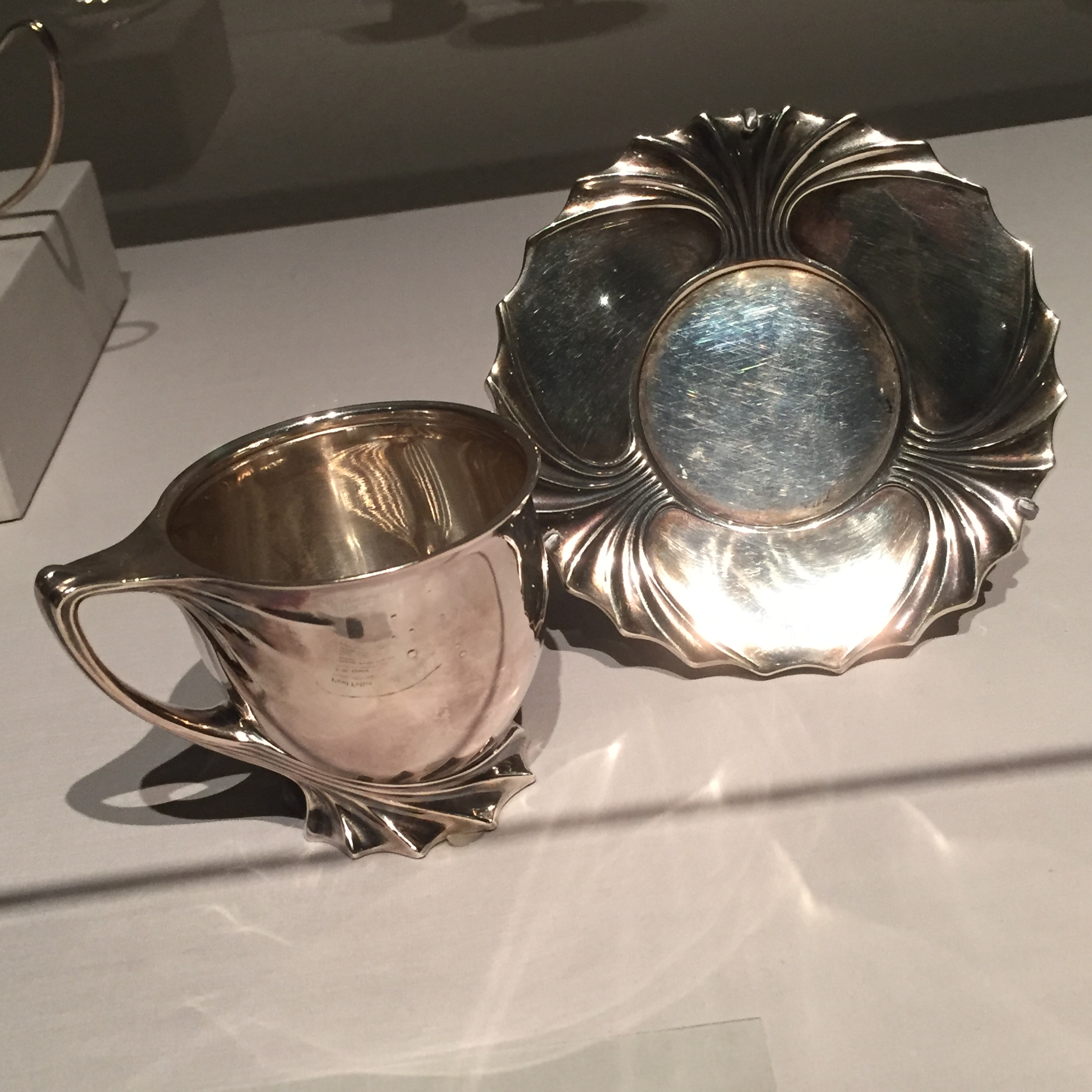
Organic Design Cup and Saucer, 1902, by Paul Follot.

Follot designed textiles and wallpapers in traditional and modern styles. In 1928 Follot said, “We know that the 'necessary' alone is not sufficient for man and that the superfluous is indispensable for him, otherwise let us also suppress music, flowers, perfumes… and the smiles of ladies!” Writing of Follot's interiors in Art et Décoration (1929) the critic Gabriel Mourey stated that “[O]ne breathes a comfortable and precious atmosphere, sheltered from the noise, agitation, and tumultuousness of the outside world. No violence, no brutality.”

== Publications ==
- Follot, Paul (1900). Documents de bijouterie et orfèvrerie modernes. Henri Laurens. p. 4.
- Follot, Paul (1927). Interieures français au salon des artistes décorateurs. C. Moraeu. p. 48.
- Waring, Samuel James; Follot, Paul (1928). Modern Art in French & English Decoration & Furniture: Exhibition, Waring & Gillow Galleries, 1928. Waring & Gillow. p. 25.
- Camard & associés; Follot, Paul (2011). Follot Paul, 1877-1941, arts décoratifs XXe: vente, Paris, Drouot Montaigne, 22 mars 2011. Camard & associés. p. 254.

== Sources ==
- Campbell, Gordon (2006-11-09). The Grove Encyclopedia of Decorative Arts. Oxford University Press. ISBN 978-0-19-518948-3.
- Cerio, Gregory (October 2009). "The purists Paul Follot and Maurice Dufrène". Antiques. Archived from the original on 2015-06-26.
- "Follot Paul (1877–1941)". Art et décoration. December 1926. Archived from the original on 2015-06-26.
- Jackson, Lesley (2007-02-08). Twentieth Century Pattern Design. Princeton Architectural Press. ISBN 978-1-56898-712-5.
- Miller, Judith (2005-10-03). Art Deco. DK Publishing. ISBN 978-0-7566-4906-7.
- Nadelhoffer, Hans (2007-10-18). Cartier. Chronicle Books. ISBN 978-0-8118-6099-4.
- "Paul Follot". Belovedlinens. Archived from the original on August 22, 2009.
- "Paul Follot". Ketterer Kunst.
- Samoyault-Verlet, Colombe (2015). "FOLLOT PAUL - (1877-1941)". Encyclopædia Universalis (in French).
- Widmann, Melanie Paquette (2012-07-02). Eugene Grasset: a Passion for Design. CTG Publishing. ISBN 978-1-4782-1061-0.
