= Michel Chalhoub =

French businessman (1931–2021)

- Born: 9 October 1931; Damascus, First Syrian Republic
- Died: 30 July 2021 (aged 89); Saint-Jean-Cap-Ferrat, Alpes-Maritimes, France
- Occupation: Businessman
- Known for: Founder of Chalhoub Group
- Spouse: Widad Chalhoub
- Children: 2

Michel Chalhoub (Arabic: ميشيل شلهوب; 9 October 1931 – 30 July 2021) was a Syrian-French billionaire, and founder of the Chalhoub Group. As of August 2021, his net worth was estimated at US$1.1 billion.

== Early life ==
Michel Chalhoub was born in Damascus, Syria, in 1931.

== Career ==
Michel and Widad Chalhoub started their business in Damascus in 1955. After the successful military coup of Syria and the economic uncertainty, they were compelled to move to Beirut. A decade later, due to the Lebanese Civil War, they relocated to Kuwait where the company flourished and their sons, Anthony and Patrick, joined the Group.

In 1990, after the invasion of Kuwait, followed by the Gulf War, they established an exile operation in order to keep the company going.

They ended up controlling about 20% of the region's market in luxury goods. Chalhoub's daughter-in-law Ingie owns the Etoile Group, a luxury goods business in the Middle East.

== Personal life and death ==
Michel Chalhoub was married to Widad, and they lived in Dubai. Their two sons, Anthony and Patrick, took over as co-CEOs of Chalhoub Group in 2001.

Michel Chalhoub died on 30 July 2021, aged 89. He was survived by his wife Widad, his son Patrick (who became the sole CEO of the company) and his grandchildren. In January 2025, Patrick handed over the CEO position to his son Michael Chalhoub to continue the family legacy.
