= Dozy Mmobuosi =

Nigerian tech entrepreneur

- Born: April 1978 (age 48); Lagos, Nigeria
- Citizenship: Nigerian
- Organization: Tingo Group

Dozy Mmobuosi (Note: Mmobuosi's name has been given as Dozy Odogwu Mmobuosi (by Companies House) and Odogwu Banye Mmobuosi (in SEC filings and The Times). In February 2024, Mmobuosi told the Nigerian Guardian: "I wish to state clearly that my name is not Odogwu. My name is Dozy Mmobuosi, born Chiedozi Mmobuosi. I adopted Dozy over two decades ago. Dozy is on my official records.") (born April 1978) is a Nigerian businessman and entrepreneur. As the founder and former CEO of the Tingo Group, he has been the subject of fraud allegations in the United States.

In Nigeria, the Economic and Financial Crimes Commission (EFCC) charged Mmobuosi with conspiracy and obtaining by false pretense in a 2018 case involving allegations of a N31 million dud cheque for diesel fuel. The case was adjourned after his co-defendant failed to appear in court.

In 2023, the US Securities and Exchange Commission filed charges against him saying he had been attempting to defraud investors by inflating Tingo companies’ financial performance figures. On 2 January 2024, Mmobuosi was charged in the US with securities fraud, making false filings with the SEC, and conspiracy charges. Mmobuosi said the allegations were unfounded but, in September 2024, a US district court ordered Mmobuosi and his three entities to pay a fine of $250mn as final judgement by default following the SEC civil complaint.

Tingo Group reportedly ceased activities in December 2024, though Mmobuosi subsequently launched two new Tingo-branded AI-driven ventures in February 2025.

== Early life and education ==
Mmobuosi was born in Lagos, Nigeria. He received a Bachelor of Science degree in political science and a Master of Science degree in economics from Ambrose Alli University in Ekpoma, Edo State. He received a doctorate degree in rural advancement from University of Putra Malaysia in 2007, although Hindenburg Research, a short-selling activist group, was not able to verify this in their June 2023 report. In March 2022, Mmobuosi completed the Advanced Management and Leadership Programme at Saïd Business School, University of Oxford.

== Career ==
In 2001, Mmobuosi founded Tingo Mobile to provide mobile technology and Fintech solutions to rural communities in Nigeria. In 2015, Mmobuosi founded Tingo Inc., a publicly traded company on the OTC Markets Group. In January 2019, Mmobuosi launched Nwassa, a digital Agri-Marketplace.

Nigeria's Economic and Financial Crimes Commission (EFCC) charged Mmobuosi with conspiracy and obtaining by false pretense in a 2018 case involving allegations of a N31 million dud cheque for diesel fuel. The case was adjourned after his co-defendant failed to appear in court.

In December 2022, Mmobuosi unveiled the Dozy Mmobuosi Leadership Centre (DMLC), housed in Oxford, United Kingdom, with the aim of developing African leaders skills to help them transform their private and public sector services (the DMLC was dissolved in December 2024). In February 2023, it was reported that Mmobuosi was close to completing a £90 million takeover of English football club Sheffield United, reportedly paying a near-£10 million non-refundable deposit for the financially troubled club, but Mmobuosi later discontinued his bid and was planning to set up a new football club in Lagos called Club 1472. Amid his attempted Sheffield United takeover, it was reported that Mmobuosi had been sued in the US and UK over unpaid debts; in a $300,000 Connecticut lawsuit, Mmobuosi was sued by a Tingo Mobile executive for failing to pay wages for at least half a year's work; in February 2022, a UK court ordered Tingo International Holdings Inc. to pay a UK property firm £87,000 ($105,000) in unpaid rent for a home he used as his private residence in Radlett near London. He was also reported to owe tens of thousands of pounds in unpaid rent for a townhouse in London's Eccleston Square.

In June 2023, NASDAQ-listed shares in Tingo Group plunged in value after a report from short seller Hindenburg Research said the company was an "exceptionally obvious scam". The company denied the Hindenburg report claims, which it said contained "errors of fact" and "misleading and libellous content", and appointed lawyers White & Case to review the report's claims. In November 2023, dealing in Tingo and Agri-Fintech Holdings shares was suspended by the SEC over concerns about the accuracy of information about the companies. Almost three months later, Tingo Group declared itself innocent of Hindenburg's allegations based on an investigation by its own outside counsel "and further investigative work of its own". Hindenburg described Tingo's claims as "brazen and obvious fabrications". On 18 September 2023, Tingo Group appointed Mmobuosi and Kenneth Denos interim Co-CEOs.

On 13 November 2023, the US Securities and Exchange Commission halted trading in Tingo Group shares and those of related entity Agri-Fintech Securities after finding inaccuracies in their disclosures. The SEC asserted there were "questions and concerns regarding the adequacy and accuracy of publicly available information in the marketplace ... since at least May 10, 2022, about the financial statements and business operations of Tingo Group and its wholly-owned subsidiaries, including Tingo Mobile Ltd," and "since at least February 9, 2023, about the financial statements and business operations of its wholly-owned subsidiary, Tingo Foods PLC." While the SEC suspension of shares expired in late November, Nasdaq chose to keep trading of Tingo securities halted pending a review of provided information. Tingo shares traded as high as $5.45 in May, before the Hindenburg report, then slumped to $0.69 prior to suspension.

=== Fraud allegations ===
In December 2023, the SEC announced three charges against Mmobuosi and three US-based entities: Tingo Group Inc, Agri-Fintech Holdings Inc and Tingo International Holdings Inc, alleging fraudulent financial claims to defraud investors. As an example, the SEC said Tingo Group’s fiscal year 2022 Form 10-K reported a balance of $461.7m in various bank accounts while allegedly only having a combined balance of less than $50 at the end of the year. However, the alleged fraud's roots "date back years", beginning in at least 2019 with Mmobuosi said by the SEC to have "created fake financial statements and forged supporting material to falsely portray Tingo Mobile as a thriving and profitable enterprise with hundreds of millions of annual revenue, profit and available cash.... In reality, throughout 2019, the company had no meaningful operations or customers and about $15 in its bank account." The SEC's 72-page complaint also outlines allegedly fraudulent transactions involving Tingo Mobile in December 2022 and Tingo Foods in February 2023. Auditor Deloitte had given the firm a clean, unqualified audit for its 2022 accounts, leading Hindenburg to question if the firm had "missed or rushed through procedures". The SEC alleged Mmobuosi siphoned hundreds of millions of investors' money for his personal benefit, routing money to his account at the London branch of a Swiss private bank, EFG, used for payments relating to luxury cars, private flights between London and Lagos, and an event at The Dorchester.

On 20 December 2023, Tingo Group said Mmobuosi was temporarily stepping down as interim co-CEO of the fintech firm following the SEC charges.

On 2 January 2024, Mmobuosi was charged in the US with securities fraud, making false filings with the SEC, and conspiracy charges; the three charges carry a maximum sentence of 45 years. In a statement, Mmobuosi said the allegations were unfounded and he was "preparing to contest them to the full extent of his capacity". By March 2024, Mmobuosi, living in the UK, had given numerous interviews to journalists in Nigeria denying the fraud allegations. Meanwhile, Sheffield United's owner Prince Abdullah was seeking legal advice on whether he might have to give Mmobuosi's deposit to US authorities as the proceeds of crime.

In April 2024, as founder of Tingo Foods, Mmobuosi was present at the Lagos launch, hosted by the Ooni (traditional ruler of Ife), Adeyeye Enitan Ogunwusi, Ojaja II, of a range of Tingo-branded soft drinks "produced by Tingo BV PLC, a spin-off company from Ojaja Pan Africa Limited".

In September 2024, a US district court in New York ordered Mmobuosi and his three entities to pay a fine of $250mn as final judgement by default after his defence failed to make any representation or provide documents against the civil complaint filed by the SEC. Mmobuosi did not enter into any plea or defend the case in court. However, after the verdict, he insisted the SEC had made baseless and outrageous accusations against him and Tingo, aware that the defendants lacked the financial resources to mount a rigorous defence. He also said the SEC had ignored critical evidence, notably a report from the Nigerian inspector general of police that, Mmobuosi said, verified the legitimacy of Tingo's operations.

In December 2024, it was reported that Tingo Group had ceased activities, with its website up for sale; Tingo Mobile had reportedly laid off contractors earlier in the year, some of whom had not been paid since December 2023.

In August 2025, the SEC announced a settled enforcement action against Nigerian auditor Olayinka Temitope Oyebola and his accounting firm, Olayinka Oyebola & Co., for their role in the Tingo Group case. The SEC's complaint, to which the defendants consented without admitting or denying the allegations, stated that Oyebola and his firm discovered that Tingo executives had fabricated audit reports with Oyebola's signature for regulatory filings. According to the SEC, rather than reporting this, they assisted in concealing the fraud by making material misstatements to a subsequent auditor. The final judgment imposed permanent injunctions, a six-year suspension from practicing before the SEC, and a total of $200,000 in civil penalties. This action was part of broader legal fallout from the SEC's case against Tingo Group and Mmobuosi. The latter was reported (December 2025) to be living in the "upscale" Ikoyi district of Lagos.

=== AI ventures ===
In February 2025, Mmobuosi announced an AI-driven platform intended to transform African agriculture by offering farmers tools for crop monitoring, predictive analytics, and supply chain optimisation; TingoGPT was officially launched in Los Angeles in April 2025. Also in February 2025, Mmobuosi launched Tingo AI Radio 102.5 FM in Lagos.

== Book ==
Mmobuosi has written and self-published a memoir titled Against the Odds: My Journey Through Storms and Triumphs.

== Personal life ==
Mmobuosi is married to Oluwatosin, with whom he has three children.
