= Ingie Chalhoub =

French-Lebanese business executive and artistic director

- Born: 1959 (age 66–67); Cairo, Egypt
- Occupations: business executive; artistic director
- Organization(s): President of Etoile Group, Artistic Director of INGIE Paris

Ingie Chalhoub is a French-Lebanese business executive and artistic director who has been known as the Middle East's "First Lady of Luxury". She is most known for serving as the president of the Etoile Group, which began as Chanel's first Middle Eastern franchise and has since opened more than 80 boutiques across the Middle East. She also serves as artistic director of her company INGIE Paris. She was named to the Forbes 50 over 50: Global list in 2025.

== Biography ==
Chalhoub was born in Cairo to a Lebanese family, and, with her family, left Cairo for Lebanon during the Six-Day War. They then moved to Kuwait after the Lebanese Civil War began. There, Chalhoub and her mother co-founded the Etoile Group, which ran the first Chanel boutique in the Middle East. When Kuwait was invaded by Iraq, she left and, with her husband Patrick Chalhoub, restarted the business in Dubai in 1990 in the Jebel Ali Free Zone. She worked to convince maisons that the Gulf was a place worth investing in. She also worked to convince brands to adapt their strategy to the differing goals of customers in the Middle East.

In 2005, Etoile opened its flagship and only eponymous store, Etoile La Boutique, a luxury multibrand shopping destination for less established brands such as Rejina Pyo.

In 2009, Chalhoub also launched her own eponymous fashion label, INGIE Paris. Her designs, including dresses, evening gowns, daywear, and knitwear, emphasize a French influence. By 2016, INGIE had a showroom-atelier in Paris. In 2020, she launched INGIE's A/W20 collection, focused on '70s inspirations and paying tribute to Anjelica Huston.

During COVID, she launched e-commerce for Etoile La Boutique, something that has continued even past the end of the lockdowns.

In 2022, she altered her store layouts and offerings to emphasize limited-edition and exclusive outfits, increase focus on sustainability and make the store more Gen-Z friendly.

By 2024, she was overseeing over 80 stores in the Middle East under Etoile, including stores of Ralph Lauren, Tod's, Chanel, and Valentino. That year alone, she opened 11 new stores. In 2025, Etoile La Boutique showcased designs at Dubai Fashion Week.

Outside of her work, she is also an active philanthropist, a member of the UNICEF Leadership Circle, and an advocate for the power of her fellow Arab women.

She was awarded with the Legion of Honour in 2018 for her business and design work. She was named #74 in Forbes Middle East's Most Powerful Businesswoman in 2024. She was also named to the Forbes 50 over 50: Global list in 2025.
