= Brad Pelo =

American businessman (born 1963)

- Born: February 6, 1963 (age 63); Missoula, Montana, U.S.
- Education: Brigham Young University
- Occupations: Businessman; entrepreneur
- Known for: CEO and founder, i.TV
- Spouse: Melody Pelo

Brad Pelo (born February 6, 1963) is an American businessman, entrepreneur, and co-founder and chief executive officer of i.TV, the company behind tvtag, a second screen app for iOS. Backed by Union Square Ventures, RRE Ventures, Rho Ventures, Time Warner Investments, DIRECTV, and others, i.TV is also behind the popular namesake app for iOS and Android, and co-created Nintendo TVii for the Nintendo Wii U.

Pelo has founded or been a member of the founding team at a number of companies, including Folio Corporation, Ancestry.com, and NextPage. He also is on the board of directors of Tokyo-based D&M Holdings, the holding company for leading audio brands including Denon, Marantz, McIntosh Laboratories and Boston Acoustics. Pelo is also a movie producer and live event producer.

== Early life and education ==
Brad Pelo was born in Missoula, Montana, graduated from Orem High School and attended Brigham Young University. While in High School Pelo founded his first company and was featured in The New York Times Magazine, McCall's and SUCCESS magazine as a “teen tycoon”.

== Career ==
In 1987, Pelo co-founded Folio Corporation with his brother-in-law, Curt Allen. The two partners met with success in 1988 when they struck a deal with Novell stipulating that the company would bundle Folio’s software with every NetWare operating system it sold. Pelo was the president of Folio until its acquisition by Mead Data Central, Inc., provider of the Lexis-Nexis computer-assisted research services, in 1992. Pelo later was one of the founding team members of Ancestry.com and was CEO of Ancestry.com’s parent company, Western Standard Publishing.

Pelo later was president and publisher at Bookcraft, a Utah-based publishing house. He then founded NextPage, a compliance and information risk solutions provider. After that Pelo was executive producer of a number of feature films including The Legend of Johnny Lingo (2003), Outlaw Trail: The Treasure of Butch Cassidy (2006), and Forever Strong (2008), co-starring Sean Astin. He continues to be a partner in the production company behind the latter two films, Picture Rock Entertainment. In 2008 Pelo co-founded i.TV, a social television and second screen company, where he is CEO. As CEO Pelo has secured partnerships for the company with AOL, GetGlue, Entertainment Weekly magazine and Nintendo. From 2004 to 2010, Pelo was the senior executive producer of Utah’s largest annual event, the Stadium of Fire.
