= Lawrence Berry Washington =

American lawyer, Forty-niner, border ruffian (1811–1856)

- Born: Lawrence Berry Washington; November 26, 1811 "Cedar Lawn" near Charles Town, Virginia (now West Virginia), U.S.
- Died: September 21, 1856 (aged 44); Missouri River near Rocheport, Missouri, United States
- Relatives: John Thornton Augustine Washington (father); Elizabeth Conrad Bedinger (mother); Benjamin Franklin Washington (brother); Robert Rutherford (great-grandfather); Samuel Washington (great-grandfather); George Washington (great-granduncle)
- Military career
- Allegiance: United States
- Branch: United States Army
- Service years: 1846–1848 (USA)
- Rank: Second lieutenant
- Conflicts: Mexican–American War
- Other work: Lawyer, military officer, author, Forty-niner, Border Ruffian

Lawrence Berry Washington (November 26, 1811 – September 21, 1856) was an American lawyer, military officer, author, Forty-niner, border ruffian, and a member of the Washington family. Washington was born on his family's Cedar Lawn plantation near Charles Town, Virginia (present-day West Virginia) and was the eldest of 13 children. He practiced law, then served as a second lieutenant in the Virginia Volunteers during the Mexican–American War. During his service in the war, Washington reportedly wore the sword of his great-granduncle George Washington.

Following the Mexican–American War, Washington traveled to California in 1849 as a Forty-niner in the California Gold Rush and authored the novel, A Tale to be Told Some Fifty Years Hence. Washington then relocated east to Missouri in the 1850s, where he remained for a few years and fought as a Border Ruffian during the Bleeding Kansas confrontations over slavery along the border between Kansas Territory and Missouri. While under the command of Captain Henry Clay Pate, Washington was present at the June 1856 Free-Stater attack known as Battle of Black Jack, where he sustained minor injuries. Washington died by drowning after falling overboard from a steamboat on the Missouri River in September 1856. His family's descendants claim Washington was murdered by Jayhawkers.

Washington was a great-grandson of Samuel Washington, a great-grandnephew of first President of the United States George Washington, a great-grandson of Robert Rutherford, a United States House Representative from Virginia, and a nephew of Henry Bedinger III, also a member of the U.S. House of Representatives.

== Early life and family ==
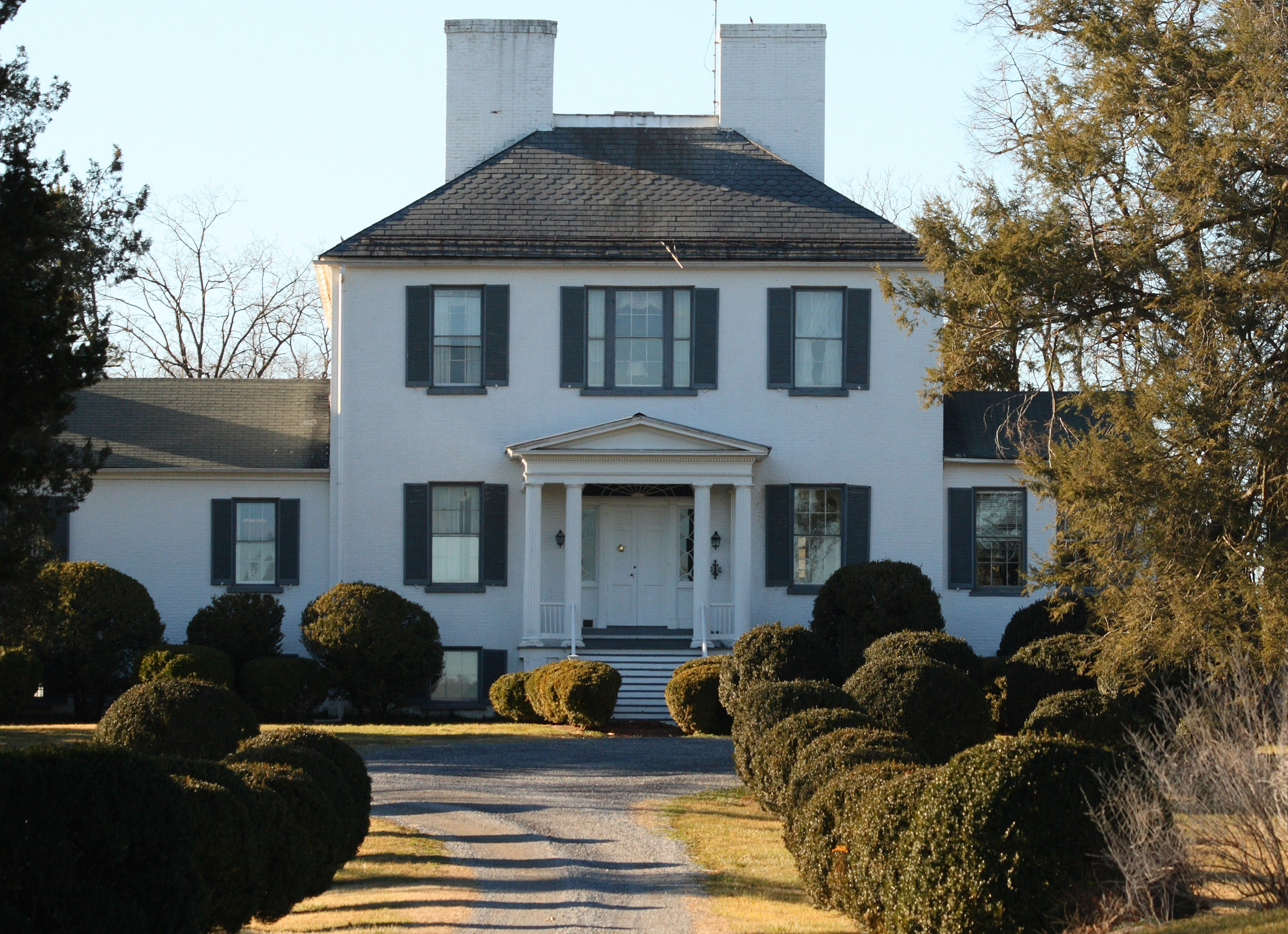
Washington's birthplace, "Cedar Lawn" near Charles Town in Jefferson County, West Virginia. "Cedar Lawn" was built by Washington's father, John Thornton Augustine Washington, in 1825.

Lawrence Berry Washington was born on November 26, 1811, at "Cedar Lawn" plantation near Charles Town in Jefferson County, Virginia (present-day West Virginia) and was the eldest son of John Thornton Augustine Washington and his wife Elizabeth Conrad Bedinger Washington.

Through his father, Washington was a grandson of Thornton Augustine Washington, a great-grandson of Samuel Washington, and a great-grandnephew of first President of the United States George Washington. Through his mother, he was a great-grandson of Robert Rutherford, a United States House Representative from Virginia, and a nephew of Henry Bedinger III, also a member of the U.S. House of Representatives who later served as Chargé d'Affaires and Minister to Denmark for President Franklin Pierce. Washington was raised in a large family at Cedar Lawn, where he had four brothers and eight sisters:

- Daniel Bedinger Washington (born 1814)
- Virginia Thornton Washington (1816–1838)
- Sally Eleanor Washington (1818–1858)
- Benjamin Franklin Washington (1820–1872)
- Georgiana Augusta Washington Smith (born 1822)
- Mary Elizabeth Washington Asbury (born 1824)
- John Thornton Augustine Washington (1826–1894)
- Mildred Berry Washington (September 3–12, 1827)
- Mildred Berry Washington Bedinger (1829–1871)
- George Washington (born 1830)
- Susan Ellsworth Washington Bedinger (born 1833)
- Henrietta Gray Washington (1835–1838)

Because of his large number of siblings, Washington's inheritance from his father in 1841 was not sizable, and he and his brothers pursued a number of business opportunities to build their personal wealth. Washington studied jurisprudence, and was operating a law practice in Charles Town by November 1844. He advertised himself in the Spirit of Jefferson newspaper as an agent for landowners in the Virginia Military District in Ohio and offered his services for the legal defense and tax payments for those lands. By August 1845, he and his brother Benjamin Franklin Washington were engaged in a real estate venture, selling lots of 640 acres (2.6 km^{2}) along the Kanawha River in Mason County.

== Military career ==
Washington subsequently served as a second lieutenant in the Virginia Volunteers during the Mexican–American War. At the onset of the war, Washington enrolled in the Jefferson County company (Company K), Second Battalion, of the Virginia Regiment in the United States Army on December 6, 1846. Two and a half weeks later he was selected by a committee of prominent citizens in Charles Town on December 24, 1846, to serve in the company as a second lieutenant.

Washington and his company departed Charles Town on January 4, 1847, and they reached the Brazos River in Texas by March 12. According to the Richmond Enquirer, Washington wore the sword of his great-granduncle George Washington while serving in Mexico. Of the sword carried by Washington, the Richmond Enquirer stated, "this precious relic will in itself be potent enough to rally every member of the Virginia regiment to the noblest and most generous deeds."

In July 1847, the Charlestown Free Press in Charles Town published a letter from Washington in which he praised then General Zachary Taylor as a potential Whig candidate for president. Washington remarked that Taylor was "a firm and true Whig" and that when he looked at Taylor, he remarked to himself "there is the President of the United States that is to be."

While at Fort Monroe in Hampton, Virginia, after the company's return east, Washington drafted a letter dated May 7, 1848, to United States Secretary of War William L. Marcy offering to raise a company of troops to fight Mexican armed forces in Oregon or elsewhere on the condition that he be granted a captaincy.

== Later careers and pursuits ==
Following his service in the Mexican–American War, Washington joined the Charles Town Mining Company and traveled to California in 1849 as a Forty-niner in the California Gold Rush with his brother Benjamin Franklin Washington; however, there are no existing records of Washington finding gold during his pursuit. While in California, Washington authored the novel, A Tale to be Told Some Fifty Years Hence, which was published in 1853.

Washington then relocated east to Missouri in the 1850s, where he remained for a few years and fought as a border ruffian during the Bleeding Kansas confrontations over slavery along the border between Kansas Territory and Missouri. While in Missouri, Washington wrote poetry and contributed to local newspapers. He returned to Virginia later in the 1850s. While in Virginia, Washington again applied for a military office in March 1855 under an expansion in the Regular Army after Congress added two new regiments to protect the large additional territory obtained from Mexico. By December 1855, Washington was in Kanawha County where he established a joint stock company to promote emigration to Kansas. He returned to Missouri in 1856, where he continued to serve as a Border Ruffian.

Washington served as a Border Ruffian in a company under the command of Captain Henry Clay Pate. On June 2, 1856, Washington and his company were attacked at their encampment near Baldwin City, Kansas by anti-slavery Free-Stater forces under the leadership of abolitionist John Brown. Upon seeing that the Free-Staters' reinforcements were nearby, Captain Pate instructed Washington to send for reinforcements of their own. Washington departed during the early stages of the engagement to send for reinforcements, and sustained slight wounds. Pate surrendered to Brown and his men, and Brown took 25 of the Border Ruffians as prisoners. The attack came to be known as the Battle of Black Jack or the Black Jack Point Affray.

== Death and legacy ==
Washington died by drowning after falling overboard from a steamboat on the Missouri River near Rocheport in Boone County, Missouri, on the night of September 21, 1856. Washington family descendants claim that Washington was murdered by Kansas Jayhawkers because of his pro-slavery Southern sympathies and possibly in retaliation for his participation in the Bleeding Kansas conflicts as a Border Ruffian. In remarking of Washington's death, the St. Louis Post-Dispatch stated that the incident "gave Kansas the name of 'Bloody'".

Washington was a lifelong bachelor, and he died without issue. His younger brother, John Thornton Augustine Washington, memorialized Washington by naming his fifth child Lawrence Berry Washington; he was born in San Antonio, Texas, on July 12, 1869.

== Theoretical American royal succession ==
According to a May 1908 article in The Scrap Book entitled "If Washington Had Been Crowned" and later in a February 1951 article in Life entitled "If Washington Had Become King: A Carpenter or an Engineer Might Now Rule the U.S.," Lawrence Berry Washington would have succeeded his father, John Thornton Augustine Washington, as "king" of the United States had his great-granduncle, George Washington, accepted the position of monarch rather than that of president. Throughout the course of 1908 and 1909, the theoretical Washington family royal succession was further publicized in the St. Louis Post-Dispatch, The Washington Post, The Cincinnati Enquirer, Pittsburgh Daily Post, The Oregon Daily Journal, and The Wichita Daily Eagle.

Following the laws of male preference primogeniture succession recognized by the Kingdom of Great Britain at the time of American independence, Lawrence Berry Washington would have been the lawful heir apparent to his father, who was the eldest son of Thornton Augustine Washington, who in turn was the eldest son of Samuel Washington, George Washington's eldest full brother. A theoretical "King Lawrence I of the United States" would have had a reign spanning from his father's death in 1841 until his own death in 1856. Following his death, the American crown would have passed to his next eldest brother, Daniel Bedinger Washington.

== Bibliography ==
- Bacon, E. L. (May 1908). "If Washington Had Been Crowned". The Scrap Book. Frank A. Munsey Company.
- Bushong, Millard Kessler (1972). A History of Jefferson County, West Virginia. Boyce, Virginia: Carr Publishing Company, Inc.
- Cooper County, Missouri Genealogical Web (GenWeb) Project (2012). "John Thornton Augustine Washington Family Bible Transcription" (PDF). Cooper County, Missouri Genealogical Web (GenWeb) Project. Archived (PDF) from the original on April 25, 2012.
- Gardner, Charles Kitchell (1853). A Dictionary of All Officers: Who Have Been Commissioned, or Have Been Appointed and Served, in the Army of the United States, Since the Inauguration of Their First President in 1789, to the First January, 1853... G. P. Putnam and Company.
- Harrison, Bruce (2005). The Family Forest Descendants of Lady Joan Beaufort. Millisecond Publishing Company, Inc. Archived from the original on February 21, 2016.
- Kunitz, Stanley; Haycraft, Howard; Hadden, Wilbur Crane (1933). Authors Today and Yesterday: A Companion Volume to Living Authors. The H. W. Wilson Company. ISBN 9780598740472. Archived from the original on July 2, 2014.
- Mahon, John K.; Danysh, Romana (1972). Infantry, Part I: Regular Army. Washington, D.C.: Office of the Chief of Military History, United States Army. Archived from the original on October 1, 2020.
- McGee, Ted (April 1973). National Register of Historic Places - Nomination Form: Cedar Lawn (PDF). United States Department of the Interior, National Park Service. Archived from the original (PDF) on February 3, 2013.
- Oates, Stephen B. (1984). To Purge This Land with Blood: A Biography of John Brown. Amherst, Massachusetts: University of Massachusetts Press. ISBN 9780870234583.
- Smolenyak, Megan (September 2008). "King Me!". Ancestry Magazine.
- Wallace, Robert (February 1951). "If Washington Had Become King: A Carpenter or an Engineer Might Now Rule the U.S." Life.
- Washington, Lawrence Berry (1853). A Tale to be Told Some Fifty Years Hence. Baltimore, Maryland: John Murphy & Company. OCLC 25793684. Archived from the original on July 28, 2014.
- Wayland, John W. (1998). The Washingtons and Their Homes. Genealogical Publishing Company. ISBN 978-0-8063-4775-2. Archived from the original on January 1, 2014.
- Welles, Albert (1879). The Pedigree and History of the Washington Family: Derived from Odin, the Founder of Scandinavia, B.C. 70, Involving a Period of Eighteen Centuries, and Including Fifty-five Generations, Down to General George Washington, First President of the United States. Society Library.
- West Virginia Department of Archives and History (1911). Biennial Report of the Department of Archives and History of the State of West Virginia, Volume 3. West Virginia Department of Archives and History. Archived from the original on July 2, 2014.
