= I.TV =

Technology company

i.TV, LLC
- Type: Second screen
- Founded: 2008
- Headquarters: Provo, United States
- Key people: Brad Pelo, co-founder and CEO; Justin Whittaker, co-founder Carlton Cuse, Advisory Board Member
- Products: tvtag application software for iOS, i.TV application software for iOS, Android and Kindle Fire, Nintendo TVii for Nintendo Wii U (co-created with Nintendo),
- Website: i.TV

i.TV (pronounced i dot TV) is a second screen and social television technology company, and creator of tvtag, a second screen app for iPhone.

i.TV is also behind the popular namesake app for iOS and Android, and is co-creator of Nintendo TVii for the Nintendo Wii U video game console.

i.TV has standing partnerships with AOL, Huffington Post and Entertainment Weekly magazine (EW), for which it powered viEWer, a social television platform that enabled television viewers to interact with each other and EW editors, and product integration agreements with TiVo, Netflix, Hulu, and Comcast.

i.TV's financial backers include venture capital firms Union Square Ventures (backer of Twitter, Tumblr and other companies), RRE Ventures, Rho Ventures, Time Warner Investments, DIRECTV, and others.

i.TV's advisory board includes Carlton Cuse, executive producer of ABC's Lost and A&E's Bates Motel, who in 2010 was named to the Time 100, an annual list of the "100 most influential people in the world"; and Gordon Ho, former executive vice president of Walt Disney Studios Home Entertainment.

== History ==
i.TV was founded in 2008 by Brad Pelo, who is CEO, and Justin Whittaker. Pelo previously co-founded Folio Corporation and was founding CEO of the parent company of Ancestry.com, among other ventures and projects.

In May 2011 i.TV and AOL together re-launched AOL's online destination for TV viewers, AOL TV, based on i.TV's technology platform. AOL TV receives 1.6 million hits per day.

In November 2013 i.TV acquired GetGlue, maker of a leading second screen and social TV check-in platform. Headquartered in New York City, GetGlue reportedly has over 4.5 million registered users.

In January 2014 i.TV launched tvtag, a second screen iPhone app that provides a feed of television moments that users can then share, doodle on and comment on in a variety of ways. These moments in a “tagline” are captured and curated by a team of 50 staffers.

A year later, tvtag was shut down.
