= Social television =

Union of television and social media

Social television is the union of television and social media. Millions of people now share their TV experience with other viewers on social media such as Twitter and Facebook using smartphones and tablets. TV networks and rights holders are increasingly sharing video clips on social platforms to monetise engagement and drive tune-in.

The social TV market covers the technologies that support communication and social interaction around TV as well as companies that study television-related social behavior and measure social media activities tied to specific TV broadcasts – many of which have attracted significant investment from established media and technology companies. The market is also seeing numerous tie-ups between broadcasters and social networking players such as Twitter and Facebook. The market is expected to be worth $256bn by 2017.

Social TV was named one of the 10 most important emerging technologies by the MIT Technology Review on Social TV in 2010. And in 2011, David Rowan, the editor of Wired magazine, named Social TV at number three of six in his peek into 2011 and what tech trends to expect to get traction. Ynon Kreiz, CEO of the Endemol Group told the audience at the Digital Life Design (DLD) conference in January 2011: "Everyone says that social television will be big. I think it's not going to be big—it's going to be huge".

Much of the investment in the earlier years of social TV went into standalone social TV apps. The industry believed these apps would provide an appealing and complimentary consumer experience which could then be monetized with ads. These apps featured TV listings, check-ins, stickers and synchronised second-screen content but struggled to attract users away from Twitter and Facebook. Most of these companies have since gone out of business or been acquired amid a wave of consolidation and the market has instead focused on the activities of the social media channels themselves – such as Twitter Amplify, Facebook Suggested Videos and Snapchat Discover – and the technologies that support them.

== Twitter ==
Twitter and Facebook are both helping users connect around media, which can provoke strong debate and engagement. Both social platforms want to be the 'digital watercooler' and host conversation around TV because the engagement and data about what media people consume can then be used to generate advertising revenue.

As an open platform, conversation on Twitter is closely aligned with real-time events. In May 2013, it launched Twitter Amplify – an advertising product for media and consumer brands. With Amplify, Twitter runs video highlights from major live broadcasts, with advertisers' names and messages playing before the clip.

By February 2014, all four major American TV networks had signed up to the Amplify program, bringing a variety of premium TV content onto the social platform in the form of in-tweet real-time video clips. In June 2014, Twitter acquired its Twitter Amplify partner in the U.S. SnappyTV, a company that was helping broadcasters and rights holders to share video content both organically across social and via Twitter's Amplify program. Twitter continues to rely on Grabyo, which has also struck numerous deals with some of the largest broadcasters and rights holders in Europe and North America to share video content across Facebook and Twitter.

== Facebook ==
Facebook made significant changes to its platform in 2014 including updates to its algorithm to enhance how it serves video in users' feeds. It also launched video autoplay to get users to watch the videos in their feeds. It rapidly surpassed Twitter and by the end of 2014 it was enjoying three billion video views a day on its platform and had announced a partnership with the NFL, one of Twitter's most active Twitter Amplify partners. In April 2015, at its F8 Developer Conference, it revealed it was working with Grabyo among other technology partners to bring video onto its platform. Then in July it announced it would be launching Facebook Suggested Videos, bringing related videos and ads to anyone that clicks on a video – a move that not only competed with Twitter's commercial video offering but also put it in direct competition with YouTube.

== TV Time ==
TV Time is a television dedicated social network that allows users to keep track of the television series they watch, as well as films. It also allows them to express their reaction to the media they have seen with episode specific voting for favorite characters and emotional reaction to episodes, as well as commenting in episode restrictive pages. This way users are able to avoid spoilers while also finding a precise audience and community for each of their interactions, as opposed to bigger, non-television dedicated social medias such as Facebook and Twitter where the likelihood of unintentionally reading spoilers is much higher. TV Time offers an analytics service called "TVLytics" where the votes and reactions collected from users can be studied for research and television production purposes.

== Advertising ==
According to Businessinsider.com, there are variety of applications for social TV, including support for TV ad sales, optimizing TV ad buys, making ad buys more efficient, as a complement to audience measurement, and eventually, audience forecasting and real-time optimization. Social TV data can ease access to focus groups and may create a positive feedback loop for generating ultra-sticky TV programming and multi-screen ad campaigns.

== In numbers ==
Viewers share their TV experience on social media in real-time as events unfold: between 88-100m Facebook users login to the platform during the primetime hours of 8pm – 11pm in the US. The volume of social media engagement in TV is also rising – according to Nielsen SocialGuide, there was a 38% increase in tweets about TV in 2013 to 263m.

For the 2014 Super Bowl, Twitter reported that a record 24.9 million tweets about the game were sent during the telecast, peaking at 381,605 tweets per minute. Facebook reported that 50 million people discussed the Super Bowl, generating 185 million interactions.

The 2014 Oscars generated 5m tweets, viewed by an audience of 37m unique Twitter users and delivering 3.3bn impressions globally as conversation and key moments were shared virally across the platform.

In 2014 the All England Lawn Tennis Club (AELTC), hosts of Wimbledon, used Grabyo to share video content across social. The videos were viewed 3.5 million times across Facebook and Twitter. In partnered with Grabyo again in 2015 and the videos generated over 48 million views across Facebook and Twitter.

== Television shows with social integration ==
Here are some examples of how TV executives are integrating social elements with TV shows:

- C-SPAN streamed tweets from US Senators and Representatives during the quorum call
- The Voice had the judges of the program tweet during the show and the posts scrolls on the bottom of the screen. The use of Twitter also led to an increase in viewers.
- "Glee" Entertainment Weekly created a second screen viewing platform for the Glee season 3 premiere.

== Related publications ==
- Erika Jonietz. "Making TV Social, Virtually" MIT Technology Review. (January 11, 2010)
- AmigoTV (Alcatel-Lucent; Coppens et al.) – 2004 www.ist-ipmedianet.org/Alcatel_EuroiTV2004_AmigoTV_short_paper_S4-2.pdf
- Nextream (MIT Media Lab, Martin et al.) – 2010
- Social Interactive Television: Immersive Shared Experiences and Perspectives (P. Cesar, D. Geerts, and K. Chorianopoulos (eds.)) – 2009
- Social TV and the Emergence of Interactive TV – Multimedia Research Group – November 2010
- Interactive Social TV on Service Oriented Environments: Challenges and Enablers (May 2011)

== Systems ==
- Boxee – acquired by Samsung
- GetGlue – acquired by i.TV
- Grabyo
- KIT digital
- Miso TV
- Tank Top TV
- WiO
- Xbox Live

== See also ==
- Interactive television
- Personal broadcasting
- Smart TV
- Social aspects of television
- Social network service
- Social news website
- Social software
