= David Tench Tonight =

- Created by: Zapruder's Other Films
- Starring: Host; David Tench
- Country of origin: Australia
- No. of episodes: 16

Production
- Running time: 30 minutes per episode (inc. commercials)

Original release
- Network: Network 10
- Release: 17 August – 25 December 2006

David Tench Tonight was a short-lived television talk show created for Network 10 in Australia. The series featured David Tench, an animated fictional character, as host. The name "Tench" is a partial anagram created from the name Channel Ten. The actor behind the digital Tench was Australian actor Drew Forsythe.

Tench conducted interviews with various "celebrities" including Jimmy Barnes, Meat Loaf, Toni Collette, Nelly Furtado, Johnny Knoxville and future Australian Prime Minister Julia Gillard. The 2006 season finale (episode 15) was shown on 23 November 2006. A Christmas special aired on 25 December 2006 at 10:30pm. On 5 April 2007, the show was axed.

== Tenchnology ==
Tench was rendered and animated in real-time using motion capture technology. The guests were therefore able to see him and respond to him in real-time.

Radio host Mick Molloy, who was a guest on the 11 October 2006 episode, clarified on his radio show Tough Love that the David Tench desk had no-one behind it and the guest spoke to a television setup behind the desk to "interact" with Tench.

The character of Tench was conceived by Andrew Denton and technically designed by Australian visual effects company Animal Logic. Animal Logic used the VICON MX40 technology to create David Tench.

The concept of an animated talk show host was not entirely new. Hand-drawn animation was used to bring Space Ghost to life in the 1994 talk show Space Ghost Coast to Coast. An earlier similar gimmick was used in the British talk and music video show The Max Talking Headroom Show, featuring Max Headroom. Max, however, was not computer-generated but was realised by a clever mixture of prosthetic costuming and video effects, and was also able to interact with his guests.

== Viral marketing ==
Before the program's airing, Network 10 used viral marketing to create publicity for the then unestablished show and character. Publicity included small-spot television advertisements with David Tench quotes written for the show, accompanied by the simple tagline, "finally, someone real on television."

A large amount of general interest was generated with seemingly minimal effort. However, this method of marketing was criticised by some as a cheap stunt to fool people's better judgement.

== Revelation and premiere ==
During the finale of Big Brother 2006 on 31 July 2006, Network Ten had revealed Tench as an animated talk show host with an "American accent". However, he often had a cultivated Australian accent that vacillated into a transatlantic accent.

The 30-minute premiere episode aired on Thursday, 17 August 2006 at 8.30pm (AEST).

The studio audience was made up of the general public who attended the show's taping.

== Public opinion and media regarding David Tench ==
- On the morning of the first episode, The West Australian newspaper compared Tench's appearance to Liam Bartlett, who had recently left Perth radio to join 60 Minutes.
- eBroadcast reported that the ratings for the first show averaged 1.162 million viewers to be number 10 on the most-watched list but was behind new shows that premiered the same night including Celebrity Survivor.
- The City Weekly (a Sydney publication) discussed in its 24 August 2006 print edition how Channel Ten tried to pass off a promotion for David Tench Tonight as a "legitimate" news item during its 5pm main news bulletin.
- David Tench was interviewed by Flip Shelton in the Herald Sun regarding his background and return from the United States to host David Tench Tonight (despite the obvious fictitious nature of both the character and the identity outside the character).
- The Daily Telegraph has discussed Drew Forsythe, the voice behind David Tench, and how he goes about "playing" Tench via motion-capture technology.
- The Australian newspaper (via news.com.au) reports that Andrew Denton and Anita Jacoby are in Europe pitching David Tench to television networks at the MIPCOM television sales conference - the article also reports that Network Ten originally committed to a 26-episode run merely to make the series' development viable. The article also discussed the poor ratings of late.
- The Daily Telegraph reported that The Wiggles endured a "lashing" in a then-upcoming episode (19 October 2006) and may not want to return for a second interview.

== Cancellation ==
Andrew Denton was interviewed by the Daily Telegraph on 5 April 2007 and confirmed that David Tench Tonight was axed by Network 10.

The program's website is no longer online.

== Segments ==
- A Tench Thought - A thought by Tench.
- Return Fire - David Tench reads a letter or two from viewers and respond controversially.
- For Legal Reasons - Tench says some controversial things that his lawyers and celebrities' lawyers tell him to apologise for.
- You Got Me, Dave - A prediction if a celebrity came on the show; most notably, calling Germaine Greer a revolting old reptile for insulting Steve Irwin.
- Last Burst of Tench - Tench would finish with a brief, controversial statement.

== Episode list and guests ==
Ep#	Airdate	Guests
01	17 August 2006	Patrick Rafter, Ella Hooper
02	24 August 2006	Nelly Furtado, Nick Lachey
03	31 August 2006	Claudia Karvan, Mark Holden
04	7 September 2006	Ronn Moss, Toni Collette
05	14 September 2006	Shannon Noll, Amanda Keller
06	21 September 2006	Jimmy Barnes, Daniel MacPherson
07	28 September 2006	Layne Beachley, Matthew Reilly, Meat Loaf
08	5 October 2006	Georgie Parker, Jason Stevens, Troy Cassar-Daley
09	12 October 2006	Mick Molloy, Tara Moss
10	19 October 2006	Anthony Field and Murray Cook (The Wiggles), Gia Carides
11	26 October 2006	Guy Sebastian, Kate Fischer, Matt Welsh
12	2 November 2006	Adam Gilchrist, Kate Ceberano
13	9 November 2006	Marcia Hines, Father Bob McGuire
14	16 November 2006	Ronan Keating, Liz Ellis, Angry Anderson
15	23 November 2006	Johnny Knoxville, Andrew Gaze, Julia Gillard
16	25 December 2006	This special Christmas episode featured all of David Tench's 35 past guests

== See also ==
- List of Australian television series
