= NPJ =

NPJ may refer to:

- Non-profit journalism
- Network Professional Journal, a publishing service of the Network Professional Association
- Nature Partner Journals, a series of open-access journals published by Springer Nature
