= Ancestry.com =

American online genealogy company

Ancestry.com Operations Inc.
- Type: Private
- Industry: Genealogy, genetic genealogy, online publishing, software publishing
- Founded: 1996; 30 years ago
- Founders: Paul Brent Allen; Dan Taggart
- Headquarters: Draper, Utah, U.S.
- Key people: Howard Hochhauser (CEO); TBD (CFO)
- Products: Ancestry.com; Ancestry.ca; Ancestry.co.uk; Ancestry DNA; Archives.com; Know your Pet DNA; Find a Grave; Fold3; Newspapers.com; Rootsweb; AncestryProGenealogists; Forces War Records UK; Geneanet
- Revenue: ▲US$1 billion (2022)
- Owner: The Blackstone Group
- Members: 25 million
- Number of employees: 1,400
- Website: ancestry.com

Ancestry.com Operations Inc. is an American genealogy company based in Draper, Utah. The largest for-profit genealogy company in the world, it operates a network of genealogical, historical records, and related genetic genealogy websites. It is owned by Blackstone Inc., which acquired the company on December 4, 2020, in a deal valued at $4.7 billion.

As of 2022, the company said it had provided access to 30 billion historical records, tripling its November 2018 figure of 10 billion records. In 2018 it also reported having 3 million paying subscribers, and to have sold 18 million DNA kits to customers. By 2023, Ancestry was the largest provider of consumer DNA testing in the world with a network of more than 25 million users, and Ancestry DNA testing is available in 128 countries.

As well as its main website, Ancestry operates country-specific versions for Australia, Canada, France, Germany, Italy, Mexico, Sweden and the United Kingdom.

== History ==
=== Ancestry ===
==== 1983 ====
Ancestry Publishing was founded in 1983, producing genealogical data in print form, with more than 40 family history magazine titles and genealogy reference books published.

==== 1990–1999 ====
In 1990, Paul Brent Allen and Dan Taggart, two Brigham Young University graduates, founded Infobases and began offering Latter-day Saints (LDS) publications on floppy disks. In 1988, Allen had worked at Folio Corporation, founded by his brother Curt and his brother-in-law Brad Pelo. The service was used to help members of the church research their ancestors.

Infobases' first products were floppy disks and compact discs sold from the back seat of the founders' car. In 1994, Infobases was named among Inc. magazine's 500 fastest-growing companies. Their first offering on CD was the LDS Collectors Edition, released in April 1995, selling for $299.95, which was offered in an online version in August 1995. Ancestry officially went online with the launch of Ancestry.com in 1996.

On January 1, 1997, Infobases' parent company, Western Standard Publishing, purchased Ancestry, Inc., publisher of Ancestry magazine and genealogy books. Western Standard Publishing's CEO was Joseph A. Cannon, one of the principal owners of Geneva Steel.

In July 1997, Allen and Taggart purchased Western Standard's interest in Ancestry, Inc. At the time, Brad Pelo was president and CEO of Infobases, and president of Western Standard. Less than six months earlier, he had been president of Folio Corporation, whose digital technology Infobases was using. In March 1997, Folio was sold to Open Market for $45 million. The first public evidence of the change in ownership of Ancestry magazine came with the July/August 1997 issue, which showed a newly reorganized Ancestry, Inc., as its publisher. That issue's masthead also included the first use of the Ancestry.com web address.

More growth for Infobases occurred in July 1997, when Ancestry, Inc. purchased Bookcraft, Inc., a publisher of books written by leaders and officers of the LDS Church. Infobases had published many of Bookcraft's books as part of its LDS Collector's Library. Pelo also announced that Ancestry's product line would be greatly expanded in both CDs and online. Alan Ashton, a longtime investor in Infobases and founder of WordPerfect, was its chairman of the board.

Allen and Taggart began running Ancestry, Inc. independently from Infobases in July 1997, and began creating one of the largest online subscription-based genealogy database services.

In April 1999, to better focus on its Ancestry.com and MyFamily.com Internet businesses, Infobases sold the Bookcraft brand name and its catalog of print books to its major competitor in the LDS book market, Deseret Book. Included in the sale were the rights to Infobases' LDS Collectors Library on CD. A year earlier, Deseret Book had released a competing product called GospeLink, and the two products were combined as a single product by Deseret Book.

The MyFamily.com website launched in December 1998, with additional free sites beginning in March 1999. The site generated one-million registered users within its first 140 days. The company raised more than US$90 million in venture capital from investors and changed its name on November 17, 1999, from Ancestry.com, Inc. to MyFamily.com, Inc. Its three Internet genealogy sites were then called Ancestry.com, FamilyHistory.com, and MyFamily.com. Sales were about US$62 million for 2002 and US$99 million for 2003.

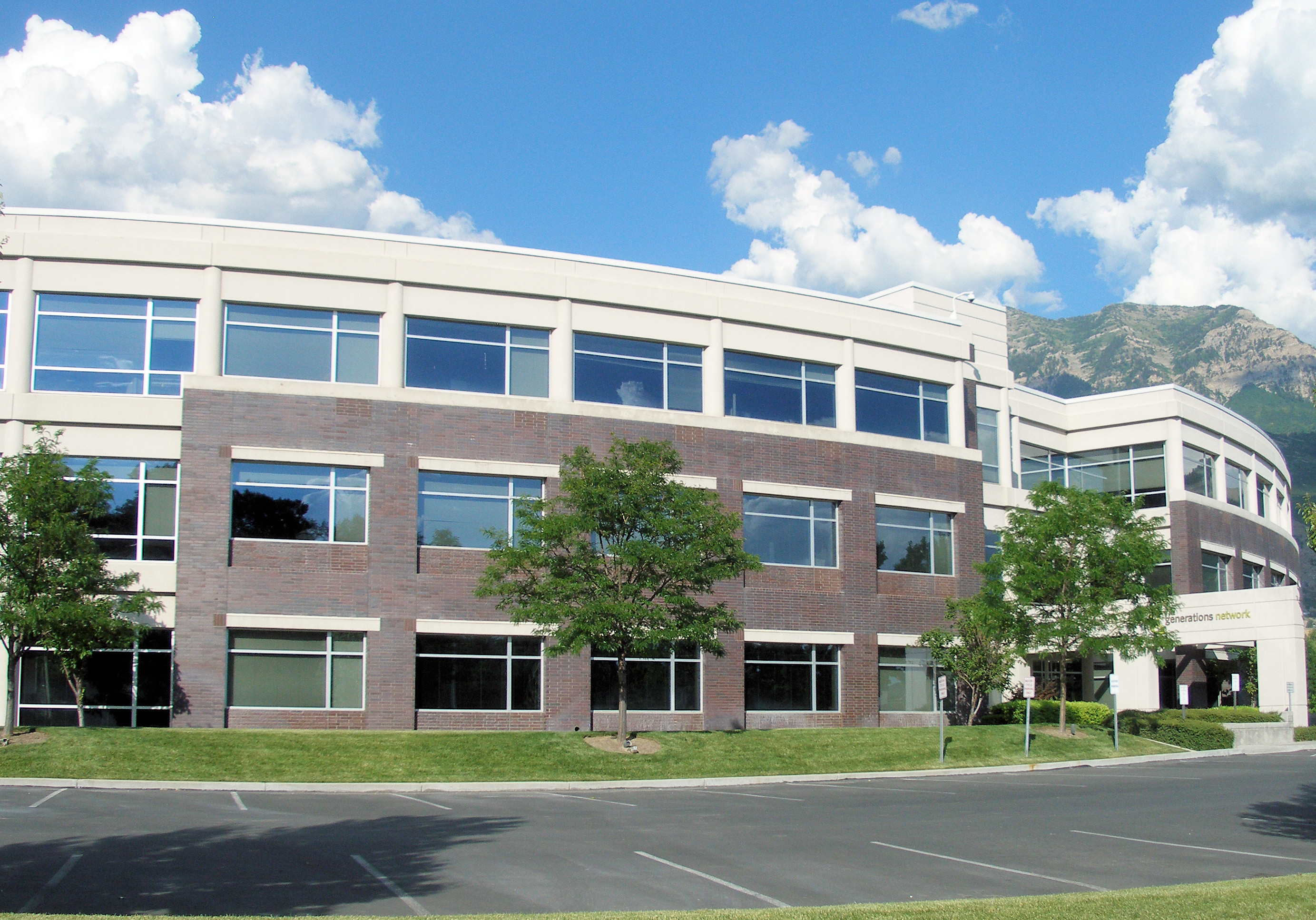
Former Ancestry.com headquarters in Provo, Utah

==== 2000–2009 ====
In March 2004, the company, which had outgrown its call center in Orem, Utah, opened a new call center, which accommodated about 700 agents at a time, in Provo. Heritage Makers was acquired by MyFamily.com in September 2005.

On November 5, 2009, Ancestry.com became a publicly traded company on NASDAQ (symbol: ACOM), with an initial public offering of 7.4 million shares priced at $13.50 per share, underwritten by Morgan Stanley, Bank of America, Merrill Lynch, Jefferies & Company, Piper Jaffray, and BMO Capital Markets.

==== 2010–2019 ====
In 2010, Ancestry sold its book publishing assets to Turner Publishing Company.

In 2010, Ancestry.com expanded its domestic operations with the opening of an office in San Francisco, California, staffed with brand new engineering, product, and marketing teams geared toward developing some of Ancestry's cutting-edge technology and services. In 2011, Ancestry launched an Android and iOS app.

In December 2011, Ancestry.com moved the Social Security Death Index search behind a paywall and stopped displaying the Social Security information of people who had died within the past 10 years, because of identity theft concerns.

In March 2012, Ancestry.com acquired the collection of DNA assets from GeneTree.

In September 2012, Ancestry.com expanded its international operations with the opening of its European headquarters in Dublin, Ireland. The Dublin office includes a new call center for international customers, as well as product, marketing, and engineering teams.

In October 2012, Ancestry.com agreed to be acquired by a private equity group consisting of Permira Advisers LLP, members of Ancestry.com's management team, including CEO Tim Sullivan and CFO Howard Hochhauser, and Spectrum Equity, for $32 per share or around $1.6 billion. At the same time, Ancestry.com purchased a photo digitization and sharing service called 1000Memories.

In 2013, Ancestry acquired Find a Grave from Jim Tipton, who had created the original site in 1995. Ancestry subsequently launched a redesigned version of Find a Grave in 2017.

On July 16, 2015, Ancestry launched AncestryHealth, and announced the appointment of Cathy A. Petti as its Chief Health Officer. That year, Ancestry partnered with the Google subsidiary, Calico, to focus on longevity research and therapeutics, in an effort to investigate human heredity of lifespan.

In April 2016, GIC Private Limited (a sovereign wealth fund owned by the Government of Singapore) and Silver Lake (a private equity fund manager) bought equity stakes in Ancestry.com. The estimated market value of Ancestry.com in 2017 was more than $3 billion.

In June 2017, Ancestry.com stated that it was migrating all of its applications and data to Amazon Web Services (AWS).

Through vintage photographs, a woman was able to document eight generations of her family, dating back to 1805, including an interracial couple. A controversial Ancestry.com advertisement had run on television stations in Utah, showing a slavery-era interracial couple. The advertisement was criticized by a news correspondent for Boston radio station WBUR-FM and MSNBC, and law professor Melissa Murray, on the grounds that it romanticized slavery in the antebellum South. In April 2019, Ancestry withdrew the advertisement with an apology.

In November 2018, Ancestry claimed to have more than 10 billion digitized records and more than three-million paying customers.

In December 2018, after authorities arrested the Golden State Killer and used GEDmatch to solve the case, Ancestry.com and 23andMe announced a data policy that they would not allow their DNA profiles to be used for crime solving without a valid legal process such as a search warrant, as they believe it violates users' privacy. In the 2021 case of the murder of George Seitz, Ancestry.com was used to help identify the remains of a crime victim.

2020–present

In August 2020, The Blackstone Group announced plans to acquire Ancestry for $4.7 billion, and in December 2020 the acquisition occurred.

In February 2021, Ancestry announced Deb Liu, a former Facebook executive, as their CEO effective March 1.

In November 2021, Ancestry announced the acquisition of French Genealogy Company Geneanet.

In March 2023, Ancestry announced that it had won a contract to digitize more than 3 million British Army service records, which it would release from 2024 through 2029. In February 2021, the Ministry Of Defence commenced transferring 9.7 million military records for individuals with a discharge date before December 31, 1963, to The National Archives UK, its largest record transfer in the history of the organization.

Ancestry's Board of Directors selected CFO and COO Howard Hochhauser to succeed Deb Liu as the company's President & CEO effective February 1, 2025. Hochhauser will continue to serve as a member of the Board. The company has initiated a search for a new CFO.

In August and later in December 2025, Ancestry updated its terms and conditions regarding Law Enforcement, in which it banned use of Ancestry family trees and records, including subsidiaries, for crime investigations and identification of human remains. Members of the Investigative Genetic Genealogy community (such as David Gurney and Cairenn Binder of Ramapo College of NJ, and CeCe Moore of Parabon NanoLabs) believe these changes will stall the solving of cold cases.

== Subsidiaries ==
=== AncestryDNA ===
AncestryDNA is a subsidiary of Ancestry LLC. AncestryDNA offers a direct-to-consumer genealogical DNA test. Consumers provide a sample of their DNA to the company for analysis. AncestryDNA then uses DNA sequences to infer family relationships with other Ancestry DNA users, and to infer "ancestral regions" (previously "ethnicity estimates"). Previously, Ancestry.com also offered paternal Y-chromosome DNA and maternal mitochondrial DNA tests, but those were discontinued in June 2014. The company describes the technical process of testing in a series of scientific white papers. In July 2020, the company claimed that their database contained 18 million completed DNA kits bought by customers.

Ancestry DNA is commonly used for donor conceived persons to find their biological siblings and in some cases their sperm or egg donor. It is also used by adoptees to find their biological family members.

The testing itself is performed by Quest Diagnostics.

AncestryDNA offers the option to participate in their Human Diversity Project, a "scientific research project aimed at helping scientists better understand population history, population movements, and human health".

Members can also pay an additional fee to access DNA traits, which range from predicted physical traits to limited health data

=== Know Your Pet DNA ===
Since 2023, Ancestry has also offered genetic testing for pets, which at the moment is limited to dogs. The test compares the DNA to more than 400 breeds.

=== Find a Grave ===
On September 30, 2013, Ancestry.com announced its acquisition of Find a Grave. Site editor Jim Tipton said of the purchase that Ancestry.com had "been linking and driving traffic to the site for several years. Burial information is a wonderful source for people researching their family history". Ancestry.com launched a mobile app in March 2014.

=== Fold3 ===
Fold3 is a premium portal that specializes in military genealogy. Subscribers access an online database with military records, including stories, photos, and personal documents. It was rebranded as Forces War Records in the British & Commonwealth nations in April 2023.

The website also features the Guion Miller Roll, an Eastern Cherokee tribal roll.

=== Footnote ===
Ancestry.com acquired iArchives, Inc., and its service footnote.com, in 2010. The purchase brought in assets including processes for digitizing microfilm. Footnote was rebranded Fold3 in 2011.

=== Geneanet ===
On August 31, 2021, Ancestry.com announced its acquisition of Geneanet. Geneanet explains that the acquisition by Ancestry is the consequence of the failure of the Filae negotiations with the birth of a formidable competitor. The Geneanet.org site, which must remain autonomous, indicates that it will give access to many databases indexed by Ancestry within the framework of Premium subscriptions.

=== Archives.com ===
Archives.com was bought by Ancestry for $100 million in 2012. Archives.com is a genealogy website specializing in census and vital records. As of November 29, 2023, Archives.com claimed 11.8 billion photos, newspapers, census, and vital records in its collections.

=== Newspapers.com ===
In 2012, Ancestry spun off its digitized online newspaper components into a standalone service, Newspapers.com. By 2024, the site had more than 25,000 newspapers able to be searched, including some from ten different countries. The website's principal competitor is NewspaperArchive, which claims it has online newspapers dating from 1607 worldwide, and its index in March 2024 included more than 16,000 newspapers. Both websites have similar models for increasing their databases: striking deals with libraries, publishers and historical organizations to scan the publications for free to include in their database. Some participants see the process of free scanning as an easier, cheaper and quicker way to get their publications online than working through the U.S. government-operated National Digital Newspaper Program.

=== RootsWeb ===
RootsWeb, acquired by Ancestry in June 2000, is a free genealogy community that uses online forums, mailing lists, and other resources to help people research their family history. Users can upload GEDCOM files of their information for others to search at the WorldConnect portion of the site. Trees uploaded to WorldConnect are searchable at both the RootsWeb and Ancestry Web sites.

On December 20, 2017, a file containing 300,000 RootsWeb user names, passwords, and email addresses was exposed to the Internet. The 300,000 records were from RootsWeb surname list service; 55,000 of those records were also Ancestry.com login credentials. By 2024, the hosted Web sites were all read-only, disabling all user logins.

=== We Remember ===
We Remember is a free online memorial platform, which was launched by Ancestry in November 2017. It allows users to create a space to preserve and share photos and videos about the deceased.

=== Forces War Records ===
Forces War Records was a low cost provider of transcribed genealogical data from British sources. Much of the content behind their paywall had simply been taken from public domain sources. As a consequence, there was a lack of transparency as to where they sourced their content from. (See Wikipedia:Reliable sources/Noticeboard/Archive 315#RfC: forces-war-records.co.uk) They came under criticism for difficulties in canceling subscriptions, with a complaint about their misleading marketing being upheld by the Advertising Standards Authority.

Acquired by Ancestry on May 24, 2021, the press release announced that 'Forces War Records is a British military genealogy-specialist website with a unique product that helps people both discover and contextualize their family's military history.' Given that Fold3 had a negative perception as "US-centric", the same dataset offerings and web architecture were used in the UK, albeit branded as Forces War Records, from April 2023 onwards. The provision of service records for the first time ever, via this brand, as a consequence of the linkage with fold3, has reinvigorated the brand. Not only transcriptions, but also images of source documents are now available to the subscriber. In support of the brand being relaunched as a premium portal that specializes in military genealogy, half a million records were added to the (FWR/Fold3) portal in July 2023.

=== Past products ===
- Family Origins
- Family Tree Maker was purchased by Software MacKiev in 2016.
- Genealogy.com, which maintains a genealogy research website, was acquired by MyFamily.c in 2003.
- Generations Family Tree (originally called "Reunion for Windows")
- MyFamily.com allowed members to create private family, or group, websites. In May 2010, MyFamily closed its Bellevue, Washington, development office, effectively letting its entire staff go since none of the staff accepted an offer to move to Provo. Ancestry shut down MyFamily.com on September 5, 2014. At the time of the shutdown, MyFamily had not resolved discontent with the downloading process, which consisted of capturing miscellaneous uncatalogued photos, with alphanumeric names and no data attached, and various calendar documents, thus leaving behind the associated data, File Cabinet documents, family recipes, and all other information.
- ROOTS software series by CommSoft was one of the first publishers of series of genealogy software programs, created in the 1980s, and available until 1997. Commsoft released the other following: ROOTS89 for the Heath H-8 series of personal computers; ROOTS/M for the CP/M operating system; and ROOTS II for MS-DOS, followed by ROOTS III and ROOTS IV; and ROOTS V for Windows along with Visual ROOTS for Microsoft Windows.
- Ultimate Family Tree (UFT)

== See also ==
- 23andMe
- Genographic Project
- iArchives, Inc.
- MyHeritage
- FamilyTreeDNA
