= Lawrence Washington =

Laurence or Lawrence Washington may refer to:

- Laurence Washington (MP for Maidstone) (1546–1619), Member of Parliament (MP) for Maidstone
- Lawrence Washington (1622–1662), MP for Malmesbury
- Lawrence Washington (1565–1616), mayor of Northampton, great-great-great-grandfather of George Washington
- Lawrence Washington (1602–1652), great-great-grandfather of George Washington
- Lawrence Washington (1659–1698), grandfather of George Washington
- Lawrence Washington (1718–1752), George Washington's half-brother and mentor
- Lawrence Augustine Washington (1774–1824), nephew of George Washington
- Lawrence Berry Washington (1811–1856), great-grandnephew of George Washington
- Lawrence C. Washington (born 1951), American mathematician
- Lawrence Washington (actor) (born 1982), American actor and singer

== See also ==
- Washington H. Lawrence (1840–1900), American industrialist
- Lawrence, Washington, a community in the United States
