= Realtime video =

Realtime video can refer to:

- Videoconferencing
- Indeo, former name RealTime Video, a video codec developed by Intel in 1992
- Real-time video editing
