= TV listings (disambiguation) =

TV listings are a timetable of television shows which indicates at what time and on what channel the shows will be broadcast.

TV listings may also refer to:

- TV listings, an electronic program guide
- TV listings, broadcast programming
