= Billboard Twitter Real-Time =

Charts of popular music

Current Billboard logo since 2013.

The Billboard Twitter Real-Time charts were four interactive Billboard music magazine charts debuted on May 27, 2014. The charts ranked trending songs from popular and emerging artists based on how often they are mentioned in messages called "tweets" sent by social networking site Twitter in the United States. The charts "Trending 140", "Emerging Artists", "Weekly Top Tracks" and "Weekly Emerging Artists" were reported to define how fans interacted with, and influenced, popular content by ranking the most popular songs being shared on Twitter in the U.S. The first two charts updated on a "real-time" minute-by-minute basis, with the last two charts providing weekly summaries.

In August 2017, for the charts dating September 2, the "Trending 140" and real-time charts were discontinued and the Emerging Artists chart was revised to become a "breakout" of the overall Artist 100 chart, highlighting the top-performing rising acts of each week.

In October 2021, Billboard and Twitter launched two new charts, Hot Trending Songs ("Real Time" - first 24-hours started at noon on October 22, and "Weekly" - first chart release date was October 30), sponsored by Rémy Martin, which track 24-hour and weekly global Twitter trends.

== History ==
=== 2014: Charts created ===
These charts, for Billboard, represented an ongoing attempt to incorporate new-music consumption and sharing technologies in its charts. In 2013, Billboard added YouTube plays to its Billboard Hot 100 formula, alongside its Social 50 that already tracked which artists are most active on social networks, and included data from Twitter.

For Twitter, it was a follow-up to its failed Apple "#music" app, launched in April 2013 to track music on Twitter, which intended to acquaint users with new acts and see what their contacts were listening to. The app had a "Popular" page, showing music trending across Twitter, and an "Emerging" page, showing "hidden talent found in tweets." On March 21, 2014, the "Twitter Music" account wrote that the app would discontinue on April 18, and said in another tweet, "We continue to experiment with new ways to bring you great content based on the music activity we see every day on Twitter." On March 27, 2014, Billboard and Twitter announced the partnership for the Billboard Twitter Real-Time Charts, and Twitter Amplify to help with chart distribution; along with custom in-Tweet charts and a weekly in-Tweet video round up of the week in music.

Music is one of the most popular topics on Twitter, and music acts routinely dominate its list of the most popular personalities on the service, with most of the top accounts being musicians. Billboard President John Amato said “Twitter, for us, felt like the right way to capture real time more than anything else that we could think of,” and “They’re the only people that have true scale in real time. Facebook is a behemoth."

Austin Mahone's performed his single "Shadow" at the May 27, 2014, New York City launch event for the Billboard Twitter Real-Time Charts and charted for the first number one on the (Twitter) Trending 140 chart on the same day. "Problem" by Ariana Grande was the first song to top the weekly (Billboard) Twitter Top Tracks chart, and K Camp's "Cut Her Off" featuring 2 Chainz was the first number one for the weekly Emerging Artists chart, both on June 7, 2014. At the end of 2014, the first year for the charts, hip-hop was the most popular genre of music on Twitter and topped many of the year-end Billboard charts. Rapper Bobby Shmurda's "Hot Nigga" (also called "Hot Boy"), with its popular dance, gave him a number one for the real-time Emerging Artists chart for the year, with 837 peaks at number one, with Dej Loaf following at number two, and K Camp at number three.

==== Chart data collection ====
The "Trending 140" chart "is an up to the minute ranking of songs shared in the U.S., measured by acceleration over the past hour. This chart can be filtered to present a real-time view of the most shared track in the U.S. over the past 24 hours, with a weekly summary presented as the Billboard Twitter Top Tracks chart on Billboard.com and in print in Billboard". The chart's name combined a typical Billboard "top 40" sounding name with 140, for the limit of characters allowed in a "tweet" and for the number of songs the chart tracked.

The "Emerging Artists" chart "is a ranking of the most shared songs on Twitter in the U.S. by up-and-coming artists (defined as artists with fewer than 100,000 Twitter followers who have also not appeared as a lead artist in the top 50 songs on the Billboard Hot 100)", "ranked by the number of times each song was shared over the past 24 hours. The weekly ranking chart, "Weekly Emerging Artists", is, also, ranked over a seven-day period".

Songs that are shared or mentioned on Twitter are tracked and incorporated into the charts by the following criteria: "the use of, or the inclusion, of a link to the song via music listening platforms, such as Spotify, Vevo and iTunes; the use of various track sharing notations, such as a hashtag “#nowplaying” or “#np,” along with song/artist name; and the use of various terms associated with the song and song playing, such as “music,” “song,” “track,” “listen.”

=== 2017: Emerging Artists chart revised, others discontinued ===
Starting with Billboard charts dated September 2, 2017 and released online August 22, all of the Billboard Twitter charts except for Emerging Artists were discontinued. A revamped Emerging Artists chart was modeled after the same formula as the Artist 100 chart which debuted in 2014 and captures the breakout artists not on that chart. It measures artist activity across Billboard's "most influential charts", including Billboard Hot 100, Billboard 200 and the Social 50. And, unlike the original Billboard Twitter Emerging Artists chart, which ranked with song titles of the weekly most shared songs on Twitter by new artists, the new Emerging Artists chart ranks only by artist, without listing a song or album.

==== New methodology ====
The new chart "incorporates key metrics of music consumption, blending album and track sales, radio airplay, streaming and social media fan interaction to provide a weekly multi-dimensional ranking of artist popularity". And the revised chart will "exclude artists that have notched a top 25 entry on either the Hot 100 or Billboard 200, as well as artists that have achieved two or more top 10s on Billboard's "Hot" song genre charts that blend streaming, airplay and sales data (such as Hot Country Songs, Hot Rock Songs, Hot R&B/Hip-Hop Songs and Hot Latin Songs) and/or consumption-based "Top" album genre rankings (including counterpart charts Top Country Albums, Top Rock Albums, Top R&B/Hip-Hop Albums and Top Latin Albums)".

=== 2021–2023: New "Hot Trending Songs" 24-hour and weekly charts launched ===
In May 2021, Billboard and Twitter announced two new real-time charts, sponsored by Rémy Martin, that would track global music trends on Twitter. One chart, "Hot Trending Songs - Weekly" (also called, "Hot Trending Songs Powered by Twitter"), would be published weekly, like other Billboard charts, but also refreshed every 24 hours as the new "Hot Trending Songs - Real Time" chart. The charts were launched on Friday, October 22, with BTS's "Permission to Dance" trending on the first 24-hour chart and charting at number one on the first weekly released chart, dated October 30. The chart was defunct after the issue dated September 30, 2023, with Blink-182's "One More Time" becoming its final number one.
