= On TV Tonight =

TV listings and video aggregator

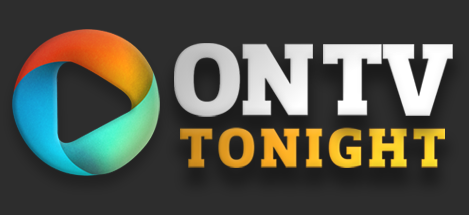
- Industry: TV listings Video aggregation
- Area served: United States, United Kingdom, Ireland, Canada, France, Italy and Australia
- Website: ontvtonight.com

On TV Tonight is a TV listings and video aggregator media company and website. Its platform collates content from multiple broadcast channels, cable TV channels and video streaming providers, allowing users to search and browse that content from a single interface. The platform provides local content for users in the United States, Canada, United Kingdom, Ireland, France, Italy and Australia.

== History ==
On TV Tonight was created in 2014 by eBroadcast, the makers of the Australian TV Guide, the first online television guide published in Australia and one of the first online electronic program guides in the world.

In July 2014, On TV Tonight launched TV listings for broadcast, cable and satellite viewers in the United States and later in Canada, United Kingdom, Ireland and Australia. It enabled users to customize their guide to hide channels unavailable to them and to choose favorite shows to highlight on their personalized schedule.

In 2018, a number of apps for the iOS and Android operating systems were made available in each region. They provided information for TV listings only.

In March 2020, On TV Tonight introduced video streaming listings, allowing users to search multiple subscription and BVOD streaming services around the world, in addition to local TV listings.

In September 2023, On TV Tonight launched their first non-English speaking guides in France (retitled TV Ce Soir) and Italy (Guida TV).

In December 2023, On TV Tonight launched a dedicated guide in the United Kingdom (retitled My Telly). It publishes schedule information for both local TV listings and BVOD streaming services in the UK.

On TV Tonight is supported by online advertising and syndication of its listings. In Australia, the company licenses its TV listings to other media companies, including the Australian Broadcasting Corporation.
