= Miso TV =

Miso
- Website type: Social Networking
- Available in: English
- Dissolved: October 23, 2014
- Creators: Somrat Niyogi, Timothy Lee, Matt Pakes
- Website: gomiso.com
- Registration: Required
- Launched: March 2010; 16 years ago
- Current status: Offline

Miso was a San Francisco based social television company that used a second screen app to enhance the TV viewing experience.

In March 2010, Miso debuted the concept of the TV check-in at Austin's SXSW Interactive Festival, positioning itself as the Foursquare of television.

The company later moved beyond check-ins by adding new features that allow increased user engagement around their television shows.

== History ==
Miso launched the first version of its app for the iPhone on March 29, 2010. In June 2010, the app launched for the iPad, and the following month Version 2.0 of Miso was released, which also added the first app for Android users.

Miso first received seed funding in May 2010 from individual investors and Google Ventures. Later that year, Google Ventures and Hearst Corporation led the Series A funding for a total of $1.5M. The following month, Miso hit its first major milestone by surpassing 100,000 registered users.

Early 2011 marked the release of the Miso API and a developer contest, which resulted in the platform being integrated and developed into devices such as the Windows 7 Phone, Blackberry Playbook, and others.

In September 2011, Miso launched a new feature for DirecTV users that allowed viewers to receive extra content as they watched, synchronized to their progress through the show. The technology connected the iOS device to the set-top box. The first supported show was Showtime's Dexter. Shortly after, the feature was extended to AT&T Uverse subscribers.

In December 2011, Miso announced a Series B investing round of $4 million led by Khosla Ventures, along with previous investors Google Ventures and Hearst Interactive Media.

In February 2013, social TV startup Dijit acquired Miso, along with its Slideshows technology. CEO Somrat Niyogi remained with Dijit in an adviser capacity.

Viggle acquired Dijit, along with what remained of Miso, in January 2014.

An e-mail was sent out to all Miso users in September 2014, informing them that the app would soon be shut down. It did so officially on October 23, 2014.

== App Features ==
Users check into television shows or movies to earn points and badges. Users can then comment on episodes of shows and ‘like’ posts by other users. Also, users can rate shows to let others know how much they liked or disliked a particular episode as well as mark which shows are their favorite. Most recently, Miso launched "Sideshows," allowing fans and networks alike to create supplementary second-screen content around any show.

== Partnerships ==
Since 2010 Miso has partnered with various television networks covering dramas, comedies, sport events, and reality shows. The partnerships have given television networks a new way for their customers to engage with their favorite television shows. Miso partners have included: Oprah Winfrey Network , WE tv, Starz, LLC, Logo (TV Channel), Fox Broadcasting Company, Showtime (TV channel), Network TEN, Sundance Channel (United States), Halogen TV, Food Network, USA Network, DirecTV, Comedy Central, The Weather Channel, Science (TV channel), TNT (TV network), and HBO.

In addition to partnerships, Miso worked with Hyundai in 2012 to run promotional events for award shows such as the 54th Grammy Awards, 84th Academy Awards, and Super Bowl XLVI.
