= Folio Corporation =

American publisher (founded 1987)

- Type: Private
- Industry: Family history, Genealogy
- Founded: 1987
- Headquarters: Provo, Utah, United States
- Key people: Curt Allen, Brad Pelo
- Products: Information database and viewing software for networks and CD-ROMS.

Folio Corporation (founded 1987) was an American software company that published information databases and related viewing and indexing software. These information databases were available on multiple formats including floppy disks, CD-ROMs and servers. The technology was eventually bought by Rocket Software, which continues to market it as Rocket Folio/NXT.

== History ==
=== Foundation and early years ===
Folio Corporation was founded in 1987 by Curt Allen and Brad Pelo. The company's first product was NFolio 1.2, released in September 1988 as part of Novell NetWare. Users could access the online NetWare manuals in the Folio Infobase format by typing "help" at any DOS prompt on a Novell network. Folio continued to spread as part of Novell's NetWare, reaching an estimated 25 million users.

NFolio allowed users to view information received from multiple sources, add personal notes, and create personal "infobases" (information databases) that could be shared and used by others. Every word in these "infobases" was automatically indexed to enable fast searching. With the release of version 2 of NFolio in March 1989, NFolio was renamed to Folio Views 1.0.

In March 1990, Folio released Folio Views 1.3 added support for legal dispositions and other legal documents. In July 1990, Folio released Folio Views 2.0 which supported hypertext links and external applications, graphics, sounds, and animation.

In 1990, Paul Brent Allen and Dan Taggart, two graduates of Brigham Young University, created Infobases, Inc., and began offering LDS Church publications on computer floppy disks, using Folio Views for their infobase indexing and presentation technology. Allen had worked at Folio Corporation since its founding, and his brother Curt was the co-founder of Folio.

In March 1991, Folio released MailBag, which stored and retrieved electronic mail messages on a Novell LAN. Folio Views 2.1 was released in June 1991, including Folio Views Personal Edition, the company's first MS-DOS program, which allowed users to manage and process information on their personal computers.

The Electronic Labyrinth described Folio Views 2.1 as "a document indexing and retrieval package for DOS text mode. In the terminology of this software nodes are folios and collections of folios are 'infobases'. An infobase consists of the original text plus full text indexing. The total file size is about half that of the original text, due to file compression, while searching supports Booleans, wildcards, and proximity criteria. Reference links may be made to other folios, external programs, PCX graphics, or audio files in RealSound format. Nodes may be grouped in clusters to facilitate organization and comparisons between groups. Text editing features include block operations and highlighting. Over forty file formats may be imported; 2GB of text may be stored in all. The interface is based on a window paradigm and supports a mouse. On-line help is available."

As of 2000, all Folio DOS programs had been retired.

=== Sale to Mead Data Central ===
On December 31, 1992, Mead Data Central, Inc., provider of the LEXIS and NEXIS computer services, purchased Folio Corporation, to compete with Lotus Notes. LEXIS-NEXIS itself was sold to Reed Elsevier Group in December 1994.

In May 1993, Folio Corporation released Folio Views 3.0, which saw product sales double. Folio grew to 104 employees and moved to RiverWoods Research and Business Park in north Provo, Utah. In October 1995, Folio announced an expanded role with Novell and its NetWare Directory Services.

In June 1996, Folio released Web Retriever 2.0, which imported web content into infobase-indexed documents. Folio's Web Retriever became Folio SiteDirector, then Folio LivePublish. In September 1996 Folio Corporation released Folio 4.

=== Sale To Open Market ===
In March 1997, Folio Corporation was sold to Open Market, which intended to use Folio's technology to enter the growing e-commerce sector emerging on the World Wide Web, for US$45 million. Open Market retained Folio's 190 employees as a division of Open Market under Folio president Bill Bennett. Open Market combined Folio's front-end document management software with its own back-end e-commerce transaction management package (OM-Transact) to develop new products for companies selling information-based services.

==== Market reception ====
In an industry-wide review of network-based internal search engines, Network Computing magazine ranked Folio SiteDirector 3.1 number 8 of the 10 products it reviewed, saying, "Folio's SiteDirector is a completely different approach to providing a searchable index of a Web site, quite unlike the other search engines we tested. In fact, SiteDirector assumes you've rendered the contents of your Web site as an infobase--Folio's term for its searchable, multilinked, compressed repository of text and graphics. SiteDirector serves up the infobase contents as HTML and lets you search the infobase."

Information Week noted that ''Infobase files store text, word processor documents, and multimedia data in a highly compressed format that includes a full index of the file's contents. The SiteDirector server instantly converts infobase files to HTML format when a browser requests a Web page. SiteDirector's search engine lets users search all the text in a multi-gigabyte infobase file in less than a second."

Newspapers were realizing that they had potential revenue in their archives. One of the users was the Salt Lake City Tribune, which used SiteDirector to sell access to their archives, stored in Folio's infobase file format.

In February 1998, Open Market announced that Folio would make use of the new standards XML for content, and XSL for style.

Open Market found Folio's technology difficult to integrate into its own technology for e-commerce websites and web content management. In a later bankruptcy court hearing, one of the statements showed that "Folio was more designed for multimedia distribution. It was not really focused on the Web. Making a conversion of that product over to the Web was actually going to be more costly than [initially thought]".

Folio 4.2 was released by Open Market in October 1998. At the same time, Open Market released LivePublish to replace the earlier Folio SiteDirector. SiteDirector was developed as a way for companies to publish information previously available only in LAN-based versions of Folio's software. Several companies that use Folio's products internally were adding SiteDirector to sell access to their private repositories on the Web.

In mid-1998, Open Market licensed Folio technology to ITM Products for that company's new Fusion technology to bridge between Lotus Notes databases to Folio infobases.

"Open Market's first quarter 1999 revenue of $12.6 million for its e-commerce products grew 116 percent over the same period of the previous year. Folio product sales tallied only $3 million for the same quarter."

Although still the number one seller of consumer e-commerce software, Open Market's share of its market fell from 31 percent in 1997, to 22 percent in 1998. It main competitor, BroadVision, was consistently gaining customers in the explosive $580 million e-commerce market. Open Market started out badly by focusing on large complex systems for large companies such as AT&T and Time Warner, building online shopping malls based on its $1 million software service contracts. The competition was focusing on smaller simple products aimed at individual businesses, and being able to respond to customer's rapid changing needs.

Open Market struggled to integrate the Folio technology into its business model, and together with a growing sense of reality among investors and businesses of high tech internet-related stocks, the company was soon seeing serious decline in its fortunes. A change in management at Open Market, and a switch in technologies in mid-1999 saw the Folio technology licensed back to Pelo and a group of Utah investors that included Alan Ashton of WordPerfect fame, under the name of ABSB.

=== Folio licensed to NextPage ===
In July 1999, Open Market ceased to sell Folio's products and instead licensed them to a new company known as NextPage; NextPage was led by Pelo, who had just ceased being the president of publisher Bookcraft, Inc. Pelo formed NextPage along with three other private investors, including Alan Ashton, one of the founders of WordPerfect.

The agreement gave NextPage exclusive rights to the future development, marketing, sales and support of Open Market's Folio product line. All of Open Market's Folio-related contracts, partnerships and licenses were transferred to NextPage. In addition, nearly all of Open Market's 90 Folio employees were retained to work in the new company that was to be headquartered in Provo, Utah. NextPage would also have non-exclusive rights to resell Open Market's non-Folio commerce products, returning royalties to. Open Market. NextPage registered itself with the State of Utah as a private company on June 8, 1999. At the same time, NextPage registered the Folio.com name. Wall Street investors responded to the announcement by Open Market's stock closing up 5 percent.

NextPage soon embarked on an expanding effort to leverage the benefits of Folio technology into what was variously called Peer-To-Peer Content Networking and eContent Platform. Within less than two years, the technology was being successfully marketed as NextPage's NXT.

NextPage, Inc. moved into its new headquarters at Thanksgiving Point in October 2000. An inauguration ceremony was held on October 16, 2000, attended by 300 guests, including Pelo, Ashton, and Utah Governor Mike Leavitt. At the same time, the company released its NXT 3 product line. NextPage technology was promoted as eliminating traditional barriers of both internal and external networks by providing users single-point access to information that may be located on several different local servers or remote servers located in other countries. Their promotional literature stated that once these sources were linked together in a secure "Peer-to-Peer Content Network," they became a single, virtual repository.

Existing Folio products would not be upgraded or improved, just supported with bug fixes (as of mid-2008, they were up to Folio 4.7). All development activities would be pointed to NextPage LivePublish / NextPage NXT, which indexed Word, HTML, XML, PowerPoint, Excel, PDF, and Folio 4.x infobase formatted documents. The next release of LivePublish was in its 6.0 version, but with a new name: NextPage LivePublish 2.0. With its upcoming release, Folio LivePublish 5.0 was informally renamed as NextPage LivePublish 1.0, and in September 2000, NextPage LivePublish 2.0 was replaced by LivePublish 3.0, but renamed to NextPage NXT 3, using the same technology.

=== Sale to NextPage ===
Folio was sold to NextPage on March 23, 2001, for $6.6 million. Open Market had licensed the Folio technology to NextPage in July 1999, with an option to purchase. Included in the sale was the building and facilities, which NextPage had only leased from Open Market after the initial deal in 1999.

In October 2001, NextPage released an upgrade to the NXT suite of products that allowed peer-to-peer collaboration over a customer's secure network. Another upgrade in April 2002, called NextPage Solo, allowed customers all of the advantages of their secure peer-to-peer secure network, by way local desktop computers or compact discs, for times that a user is not connected to a network.

In April 2003, NextPage moved its headquarters from Lehi to Draper, Utah.

=== Sale to FAST ===
On September 1, 2004, NextPage announced that Fast Search & Transfer (FAST), a Norwegian-based developer of enterprise search and real-time alerting technologies, had agreed to purchase the technology, product lines, and customer base of NextPage's publishing applications business, including NXT, Folio, LivePublish, and GetSmart. FAST had been a Value Added Reseller of Folio products since 1991. NextPage's document management services, known as Project Chrome, remained with the company. NextPage received $6 million in cash, and was eligible to receive performance-based payments of up to $9 million over four years.

In January 2006, FAST announced the release of ProPublish 4.1. The relationship of the old Folio format to this newer ProPublish format was not known, but a news release noted that ProPublish included "enhanced support for Folio and NXT content types". In 2007, FAST released Folio Views, Folio Builder, Folio Publisher, and Folio Integrator 4.7.1.

=== Sale to Rocket Software ===
On April 25, 2008, FAST was acquired by Microsoft. On December 2, 2009, Microsoft sold Folio and NXT to Rocket Software, a software development firm based in Newton, Massachusetts. On February 10, 2010, Rocket Software released Folio Views, Folio Builder, Folio Publisher, and Folio Integrator version 4.7.2, the first release of Folio to support Windows Vista and Windows 7 32/64-bit.

== Folio versions ==
Version	Release date	Company	
NFolio 1	Sep 1988	Folio Corp.	Used with Novell's Netware
Folio Views 1.0	Mar 1989	Folio Corp.	NFolio Ver. 2 renamed
Folio Views 1.3	Mar 1990	Folio Corp.	
Folio Views 2.0	Jul 1990	Folio Corp.	
Folio Views 2.1	Jun 1991	Folio Corp.	First DOS version
Folio Views 3.0	May 1993	MDC LexisNexis	
Folio Views 3.11.1		MDC LexisNexis	
Folio Views 3.11.2		MDC LexisNexis	
Folio Views 4.0	Sep 1996	MDC LexisNexis	Replaced Folio View 3.11.2
Folio Views 4.1	Apr 1997	Open Market	Included Builder and Publisher, and supported OLE and both 16-bit and 32-bit applications
Folio Views 4.2	Oct 1998	Open Market	
Folio Views 4.5		NextPage	
NXT 2	Oct 1999	NextPage	Included LivePublish and LiveEnterprise; native XML, Y2K and W3C compliant
NXT 3	Oct 2000	NextPage	
NXT 4	June 2003	NextPage	
Folio Views 4.6	March 2005	Fast Search	
Folio Views 4.7.1	First semester of 2007	Fast Search	Last Folio Views release prior to Microsoft acquisition of Fast
NXT 4.4.1	June 2007	Fast Search	Last NXT release prior to Microsoft's acquisition of Fast
Folio Views 4.7.2	First Quarter of 2010	Rocket Software	First release by Rocket Software
