= NextPage =

American enterprise software company

NextPage, Inc.
- Type: Corporation
- Industry: Information Technology
- Founded: 1999
- Founder: Brad Pelo
- Defunct: 2011
- Fate: Acquired by Proofpoint, Inc.
- Headquarters: Draper, Utah
- Area served: Global
- Key people: Darren Lee, CEO
- Products: Information Risk Management
- Website: NextPage.com (archived)

NextPage, Inc. was an enterprise software company founded in 1999 by Brad Pelo in Lehi, Utah, later relocating to Draper, Utah. The company developed information risk management software for enterprises, focused on governing access to and distribution of sensitive documents. NextPage was acquired by Proofpoint, Inc. in 2011.

== History ==
NextPage was founded in 1999 by Brad Pelo, who had built a background in peer-to-peer document networking. The company developed applications to help organisations identify, classify and control access to sensitive information, reducing exposure from accidental or unauthorised document sharing.

Pelo left the company in 2007. NextPage was subsequently led by CEO Darren Lee. In 2011, Proofpoint, Inc. acquired NextPage, adding its document risk management capabilities to Proofpoint's information governance portfolio.

== Management team ==
As of 2012:

- Darren Lee, CEO
- James Seeley, Vice President Sales
- Wayne Nelson, Vice President Engineering
