= Real-time video editing =

Real-time video editing is a system of editing video where it takes no longer to render a video than the length of that video clip itself. Live video editing is where there are various cameras at various angles and position, capturing single or multiple subjects and the footage is routed through a vision mixing device and edited and transmitted in real-time.

Broadcasters traditionally used large, disparate computer systems for real-time video editing with multiple CPUs, multiple gigabytes of RAM and high-powered hard drives. Some had additional hardware components designed to enhance the performance of the specific video editing software being used. Other approaches used to ensure real-time playback included continuous background rendering, and using multiple networked computers to share the rendering load. These systems would allow broadcasters to edit and render a video clip in 30 minutes.

These systems are now outdated thanks to the instantaneous nature of social media platforms such as Facebook and Twitter. Broadcasters and content rights holders now use cloud-based video editing technology which allows them to clip, edit and share video across multiple digital platforms such as websites and social apps within seconds rather than minutes.

Blackbird is one of the earliest examples of a cloud-based video service. Invented by Stephen Streater and released in 2004, it is credited as the first cloud-based video editor. Its diverse userbase extends from global, national and regional media organisations, leading sports content distributors and post-production houses to government departments.

Grabyo is an example of a cloud-based real-time video editing platform. It was founded in 2013, has partnerships with Facebook and Twitter and is used by some of the largest media companies in Europe and North America.

== See also ==
- Comparison of video editing software
- Non-linear editing
