= Network Professional Association =

- Type: Professional organization
- Region served: Worldwide
- Website: www.npa.org

The Network Professional Association (NPA), established in 1991, is a non-profit professional association dedicated to supporting computer IT/Network professionals, who share the common core pillars of Career Growth, Professional Development and Ethical Integrity.

== Description ==
As of 2018, the NPA has evolved its structure and no longer maintains local chapters. Instead, it focuses on providing a range of benefits to its members, including a certificate of membership, quarterly journal publications, and various opportunities for professional development and networking. The association encourages members to contribute articles to the Network Professional Journal (NPJ), addressing topics such as the advancement of professionalism for CNPs, philosophical or standards-based technical discussions, and technical reference guides.

=== Certified Network Professional Program ===
CNP logo

The NPA is known for offering the Certified Network Professional (CNP) designation, introduced in 1994 to fill the void of a professional designation for IT networking practitioners. In October 2005, the CNP underwent significant updates, reflecting the NPA's commitment to setting standards within the IT networking profession. The association, relying on the volunteer efforts of its members, actively maintains the code of ethics and accountability for the profession.

=== Awards ===
The Network Professional Association announced Awards for Professionalism in 2002. The Distinguished Fellows membership class recognizes sustained lifelong excellence in the field. The NPA received support for the awards from many partners, Network Computing magazine, Network World Magazine, Interop, National Seminars, Pearson Technology Group, Microsoft, and Novell. Award recipients are recognized for valuable contributions, their continued focus on computer networking and professionalism, and the respect of their peers. An international industry pane of judges reviews submissions and make recommendations for recognition. The awards are presented at the Interop Las Vegas trade show each year.

=== Other programs ===
The Network Professional Journal (NPJ) is a publishing service to and for network professionals. NPA members author articles relevant to the industry. Accepted technical content deals with the advancement of professionalism for the CNP, philosophical or standards based technical discussion, or technical reference guides.

The NPA provides event promotion for network computing professionals. NPA members enjoy discounts on access, exhibition space and sponsorship packages, and conference passes. Conferences and events include: 1992 Hands on Technology Labs staged at NetWorld; NPA’s Integrate Conferences 1996–98;--and since 2002: IT Roadmap; Virtualization Executive Forum; e-Financial WorldExpo; Government & Health Technologies Forums; NetWorld+Interop; LinuxWorld Canada; Desktop Summit; Business Information Security; IT Program Management Office Best Practices; Networking Decisions Conference; National Cyber Security Awareness Month; INBOX; Enterprise Messaging Decisions; PlanetStorage; Wireless & Mobile WorldExpo; Data Protection Summit.

NPA provides affinity programs and co-operative programs with other industry groups. Some include: Working Advantage; Health Card Program; Pearson Technology Bookstore; Credit Card & Training Discounts; Software / Products; Insurance Brokerage Services; e-Store; Education/Training Loans.

== See also ==
- Professional association
- Information technology
- Computer network
- IT certification
- Code of ethics
- Professional certification
