= Heritage Makers =

- Industry: Scrapbooking
- Predecessors: My Family Tales; Heritage Home Studios
- Founded: 2002; 23 years ago
- Founders: Sharon Gibb Murdoch; Candace A. May; Doug Cloward
- Headquarters: Provo, Utah
- Area served: Worldwide
- Products: Custom hardcovers; Greeting cards; other printed items
- Website: heritagemakers.com

Heritage Makers is a direct selling company that sells personalized hardcover books. It was founded in 2004 by through the merger of My Family Tales and Heritage Home Studios. Consultants are paid commissions and bonuses to conduct home party workshops where they sell a variety of products, including custom hardcover storybooks, greeting cards, and other printed products. The company is a member of the Direct Selling Association.

== History ==
Sharon Gibb Murdoch and Candace A. May founded My Family Tales after successfully pitching a product idea for custom photo and memory books for babies to Saks Fifth Avenue in 2002. My Family Tales merged with Heritage Home Studios—a company owned by Doug Cloward that created DVDs of photos and videos for consumers—to form Heritage Makers in January 2004, partially funding the $3 million to $5 million through investment by a friend who owned a sprinkler company. MyFamily.com purchased the company in September 2005. In 2006, the company became a member of the Direct Selling Association. A 2007 investment of $1.5 million allowed it to expand its electronic services. A 2009 The Salt Lake Tribune article said that ABC's Good Morning America viewed Heritage Makers as "a good direct-selling company to join" and CBS's The Early Show saw it as "one of the best personalized gifts around". In 2013, the company was sold to Youngevity International.

== Products ==
The company sells custom photo and memory hardcover books to consumers using direct sales online and through consultants who organize home-based selling parties. Heritage Makers provides an online service allowing customers to upload photos, choose book layout styles, and access a clip-art library to create their own projects. The company also sells greeting cards and other printed items.
