= TV listings =

Printed or electronic guide of scheduled television programs

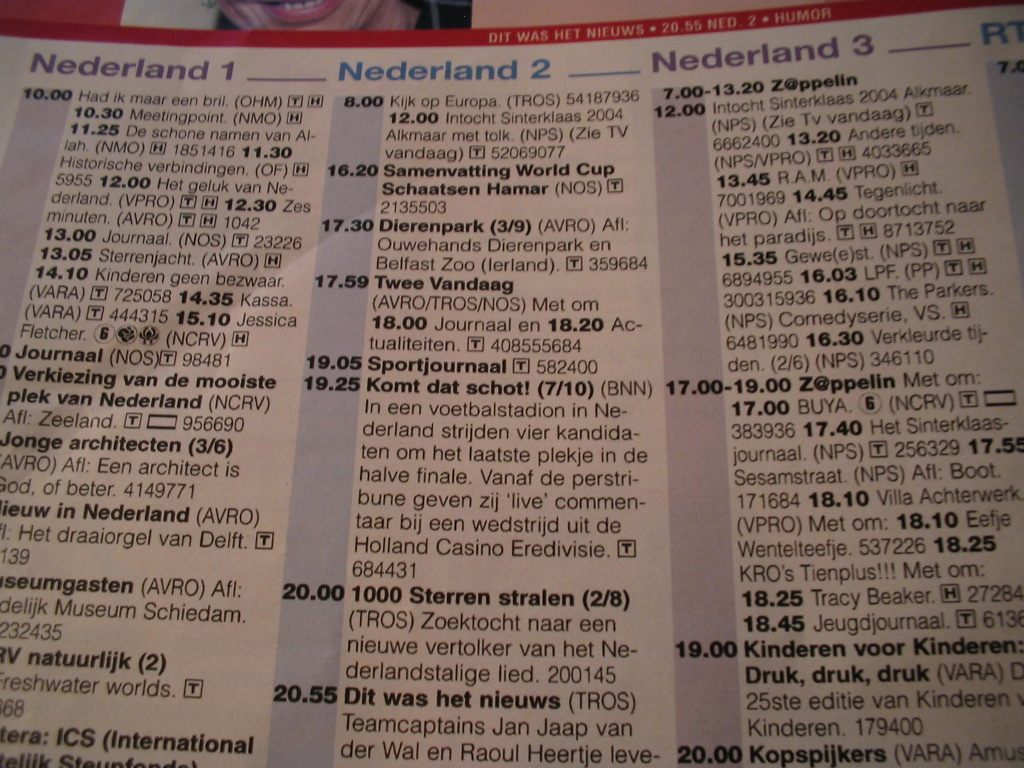
A page from a Dutch TV guide

TV listings (television listings, also sometimes called a TV guide or program/programme guide) are a printed or electronic timetable of television programs. Often intended for consumer use, these provide information concerning programming scheduled to be broadcast on various television channels available to the reader – either via terrestrial, free-to-air, cable, satellite or over-the-top MVPD – indicating at what time and on what channel they are due to be broadcast over a period usually encompassing about seven- to 14-days in advance.

== Overview ==
Since the early days of television, such listings have been printed in local newspapers, newspaper inserts, or magazines (including specialized listings magazines), but are now often viewed as electronic program guides available on set-top boxes and most digital TV sets.

Most print listings publications originally displayed programming information a text-based format modeled after program logs maintained by local broadcasters, which organized programs first by their scheduled airtime and secondarily by channel, a format that allowed complete program titles and synopses of reasonable detail to be incorporated into the guide. With the formation of other broadcast and subscription channels in subsequent years, set space requirements resulted in detailed synopses being gradually restricted to series and specials – usually those airing in evening timeslots – as well as movies.

Since the 1980s, grids – which organize listings primarily by channel in correspondence to airtime – have become the common format for displaying listings information, as it allows more space to display programming data for an expanded lineup of channels. Many national and local TV listings magazines (such as TV Guide in the United States) originally incorporated grids to show prime time listings, but would eventually begin expanding them to encompass the full broadcast day during the late 1980s and 1990s. For print publications, space requirements have largely limited the availability and detail of programming information that can be incorporated into a grid format; however, because web- and application-based APIs can fit more information into such a structure, the format does allow for detailed synopses to be included into a grid. However, most websites and mobile apps offering program listings usually incorporate synopses and other information concerning a specific television program in a clickable or swipeable dialog box.

Program listings data is compiled by various metadata providers throughout the world, which provide data to specific regions or countries. The most prominent provider of television program metadata is Gracenote, which assumed most responsibilities for program metadata dissemination from Tribune Media Services, following Tribune Media's acquisition of Gracenote (now owned by Nielsen), in 2014. Gracenote's On Entertainment service provides TV listings and synopses for approximately 85 countries – including the United States and Canada – and 35 languages, and maintains a database of program data for approximately six million television series and movies for guidance for various websites and electronic programming guides. Within the United Kingdom, Press Association, Red Bee Media Broadcasting Dataservices, REDNI and DigiGuide serve as the major providers of television listings metadata.

== History ==
=== United Kingdom ===
On 1 March 1991, the monopoly on listings magazines ended and the market was opened up. Before this, there were two magazines on the market: Radio Times, began in 1923, for BBC listings and TV Times, began in 1955, for ITV and, from 1982, Channel 4 and Welsh-dubbed S4C listings. A number of magazines appeared on the market at that time: TV Quick, What's on TV and the short-lived TV Plus. By the mid-1990s, What's on TV was UK's best-selling weekly magazine, but in 2008 a rival publication, TV Choice (began in 1999 by Bauer Media Group) achieved a higher circulation. TV Choice has a similar design and format but at a lower price.

Traditionally these have been simple broadcast programming lists of what appears in chronological order on the various channels available, having been designed for an age in which there were only a few channels, and where the only medium was paper. Today, with 600 channels in the UK today, the Internet offers different formats and possibilities for TV listings and television is starting to appear in both mobile and internet formats, so the whole approach to TV listings is changing. In addition, most UK newspapers publish a full week's listings guide in their Saturday and Sunday editions.

=== United States ===
==== Print listings ====
The first television program guide to be published in the US was released by New York City television station WNBT (now NBC owned-and-operated station WNBC) in June 1941; the station mailed "program cards" containing programming information for the week of 30 June to 5 July, to local owners of television sets. The program cards were attached with an "opinion card" at the bottom of the guide, which NBC asked owners to fill out and mail to the network.

The first local "television guide books" first began publication during 1948: Television Forecast in Chicago, the Local Televiser in Philadelphia, and the TeleVision Guide in New York City.Television Forecast was first sold on newsstands on 9 May 1948 and was the first continuously published television listings magazine. Founder Les Viahon and three other partners bankrolled the venture with an initial funding round of $250 each; they initially published Television Forecast in the basement classroom of Abbot Hall at Northwestern University, and bounded the inaugural issue with staplers borrowed from Northwestern professors. First sold on 14 June 1948, The TeleVision Guide was founded by MacFadden Publications and Cowles Media Company circulation director Lee Wagner. During the late 1940s and early 1950s, Wagner began publishing regional editions of The TeleVision Guide for New England and the Baltimore–Washington area. Brothers Irvin and Arthur Borowsky, co-founders of the North American Publishing Company, began publishing the Local Televiser (which was subsequently retitled Philadelphia TV Digest following its initial issues) on 7 November 1948, with the intent of using the publication to serve as a promotional tool to increase television sales by way of a commitment from local distributors of Philco television sets to pay 50% of the publishing costs and the provision of television set ownership lists. Many local newspapers throughout the United States also began publishing weekly listings guides for distribution as supplements in their Sunday editions, eventually extending to daily schedule inserts within the lifestyles/entertainment sections of their weekday editions.

In the winter of early 1953, Wagner sold The TeleVision Guide to Philadelphia-based newspaper and magazine publisher Walter Annenberg, who folded the magazine into his multimedia company Triangle Publications. (Wagner would serve as a consultant for its successor national magazine until 1963.) Triangle concurrently purchased numerous regional television listing publications including TV Forecast, TV Digest and the Local Televiser, intending to develop a national television magazine. Wagner's publication served as the prototype for TV Guide (originally adopted as the renaming of the New York-based TeleVision Guide on 18 March 1950), which Triangle first released as a national publication on April 3rd of that year, with a cover story about interracial couple Lucille Ball and Desi Arnaz's newborn son Desi Arnaz, Jr., who was referred to under the headline: "Lucy's $50,000,000 baby". 1.56 million copies of the digest-sized first issue were sold across ten U.S. cities.

While the initial issue was an almost instant success, TV Guide's circulation decreased with subsequent issues, even as the magazine's distribution expanded to five additional cities (Pittsburgh, Rochester, Detroit, Cleveland and San Francisco) throughout the summer of 1953. Sales of TV Guide began to reverse course with the 4–10 September 1953, "Fall Preview" issue, which had an average circulation of 1,746,327 copies; by the mid-1960s, TV Guide had become the most widely circulated magazine in the United States.

Print TV listings were a common feature of newspapers from the late-1950s to the mid-2000s. With the general decline of newspapers and the rise of digital TV listings as well as on-demand watching, TV listings have slowly began to be withdrawn since 2010. The New York Times removed its TV listings from its print edition in September 2020.

==== Electronic and interactive program guides ====
As cable television grew in distribution across the United States, methods to provide alternatives to print television listings began to be developed. In 1981, Tulsa, Oklahoma-based United Video Satellite Group (later Gemstar-TV Guide International) launched the first widely distributed electronic program guide service in North America, in the form of a cable channel known simply as the Electronic Program Guide (EPG). (Some cable providers had maintained their own in-house EPGs dating to the late 1970s.) The channel – which eventually evolved into the general entertainment network Pop – was developed with the creation of a software application sold to cable television providers in the US and Canada to provide 24-hour-a-day program listings in a scrolling grid format to their subscribers on a dedicated cable channel. It had the ability to display programming information up to 90 minutes in advance, utilizing raw listings data supplied via satellite to a computer unit installed in the headend facilities of participating systems to present that data to subscribers in a format customized to the system's channel lineup. The initial grid covered the entire screen and was programmed to provide four hours of listings information suited to each system's entire channel lineup, uploaded and displayed one half-hour period at a time. The EPG software was originally designed only to generate video, resulting in cable operators uplinking a local FM radio station or a cable-originated audio service provider (such as Cable Radio Network) to serve as the channel's audio feed.

An "optional" software upgrade released for the Amiga 1000-based EPG Sr. in 1987, incorporated a modified listings grid that was confined to the lower half of the screen. The split-screen configuration allowed for static or animated graphical advertisements for local and national businesses and logos (primarily for promotions for cable channels carried by the local system) to be created locally by each cable system operator and uploaded to the software to fill the video feed's upper half. In 1988, United Video made further upgrades to the revised EPG Sr. software (then renamed the Prevue Guide, later known as TV Guide Channel and TV Guide Network), and integrated the system with the Amiga 2000 personal computing system; the upgrades also allowed support for video and accompanying audio in the top-half video feed, allowing for video-sourced commercials and program promotions to appear in either the left or right halves of the upper-half video feed, often doubled with title, channel and airtime data to appear in the opposing halves.

In 1986, Chris Schultheiss and engineer Peter Hallenbeck of STV/Onsat – a publishing company that had been known for distributing print listings guides – introduced SuperGuide, an interactive electronic programming guide for home satellite subscribers. The original system stored programming information (up to around one week in advance of the current date) through a locally sourced computer system, and was programmed to allow a remote control to interact with the unit. Users had to turn off the guide once they found a show they wanted to watch, and then change the channel on the satellite receiver to the appropriate service. Listings information was distributed by satellite to the SuperGuide software to the home owner's dish.

An upgraded version of SuperGuide was released in March 1990; integrated into the Uniden 4800 receiver, this version – the first commercially available unit for home use that had a locally stored guide integrated with the receiver for viewing and taping at the touch of a key – included hardware that allowed storage of up to two weeks of programming information and permitted users to access the channel carrying the show they wanted to watch or set it to record (controlling a VCR unit via an infrared output) by remote.

In June 1988, Eli Reiter, Michael H. Zemering and Frank Shannon were awarded a patent for an interactive program guide (IPG) that allowed users to search programming information by title or category. In 1996, Prevue Networks (the parent of what, by that point, had become the Prevue Channel) introduced Prevue Interactive (later known as TV Guide Interactive and then iGuide), the first IPG service distributed in the United States, which was initially designed for General Instrument's DCT 1000 series of set-top digital cable converter boxes.

In 1995, publishing company TV Host, Inc. launched the Electronic TV Host, a subscription IPG service (operating as an extension of the namesake TV Host print listings magazine) that allowed users to download and search program listings, set reminders for programs users wanted to watch or record, and create personalized television listings pertaining to their viewing moods. Electronic TV Host was developed as both a website and a free-to-download, diskette-installable desktop application for Microsoft's Windows 95 (and later, Windows 98 and Windows 2000) that allowed users to download localized program information for a monthly or annual subscription via a downloadable listings database.

TV Guide followed with its own web-based listings service in March 1996, with the launch of the iGuide. Originally developed by the News Corporation-MCI joint venture Delphi Internet Service Corp. as a web portal, it initially featured a mix of comprehensive television listings, news content, TV Guide editorial content and a search feature called CineBooks, which allowed users to access detailed information on about 30,000 film titles. In January 1997, iGuide was relaunched as the TV Guide Entertainment Network (TVGEN; later renamed TV Guide Online in 2002), refocusing on television, music, film, and sports listings and information, along with wire news and features from Reuters, Daily Variety and The New York Post, free e-mail updates for registered users, and a chat room that was developed to accommodate 5,000 users simultaneously.

== List of TV listings magazines ==
=== Currently published ===
==== Australia ====
Publication	Year of launch	Current owner
TV Week	1960	Are Media

==== Canada ====
Publication	Year of launch	Current owner
TV Hebdo (Québec)	1957	TVA Publications
TVWeek	1953	Canada Wide Media Limited

==== France ====
Publication	Year of launch	Current owner
Télé 7 Jours	1960	Hachette Filipacchi Médias
Télé Poche	1966	Mondadori France
Télérama	1947	Publications de la Vie Catholique
TV Magazine	1987	Quebecor World

==== Germany ====
Publication	Year of launch	Current owner
Auf einen Blick	1952	Bauer Verlag
Funk Uhr	1952	Mediengruppe Klambt
Gong	1948	Funke Mediengruppe
Hörzu	1946	Funke Mediengruppe

==== Ireland ====
Publication	Year of launch	Current owner
RTÉ Guide	1961	RTÉ Commercial Enterprises
TV Now	2000	VIP

==== Italy ====
Publication	Year of launch	Current owner
TV Sorrisi e Canzoni	1952	Arnoldo Mondadori Editore

==== Japan ====
Publication	Year of launch	Current owner
Beautiful Lady & Television	1997	Tokyo News Service

==== New Zealand ====
Publication	Year of launch	Current owner
TV Guide	1994	Fairfax New Zealand

==== Portugal ====
Publication	Year of launch	Current owner
TV Guia	1979	Cofina

==== Russia ====
Publication	Year of launch	Current owner			
Sem' dnei	1991	Gazprom Media	Antenna-Telesem	1994	Shkulev Media Holding

==== United Kingdom ====
Publication	Year of launch	Current owner
Inside Soap	1992	Hearst Magazines UK (formerly Nat Mags)
Heat	1999	H. Bauer
Radio Times	1923	Immediate Media Company (formerly BBC Magazines)
Total TV Guide	2003	H. Bauer
TV & Satellite Week	1993	Future plc
TV Choice	1999	H. Bauer
TV Guide	1991–?	Hearst Magazine UK
TVTimes	1955	Future plc
What's on TV	1991	Future plc

==== United States ====
Publication	Year of launch	Current owner
Channel Guide		NTVB Media
OnDISH Magazine (available exclusively to Dish Network subscribers)		NTVB Media
Teve Guía (Puerto Rico)	1962	Agencia de Publicaciones
TV Guide Magazine	1953	NTVB Media
TVWeekly		NTVB Media
VIEW! Magazine! (available exclusively to Wide Open West subscribers)		NTVB Media

=== Defunct ===
==== Australia ====
Publication	Years of operation
TV Times	1957–1980

==== Bulgaria ====
Publication	Years of operation
Radio Pregled (1946–present), Radio-TV Pregled (1960–present), Televiziya i Radio (1972–2002)	1946–2002

==== Canada ====
Publication	Years of operation
TV Guide	1977–2006

==== Italy ====
Publication	Years of operation
Radiocorriere TV	1925–1995

==== Philippines ====
Publication	Years of operation
Atlas TV Guide	2009–2013
Guide	2001–2004
SkyGuide	1997–2001
TV Star Guide	1999–2009
TV Times	1978–1984

==== Romania ====
Publication	Years of operation
Programul Radio și Televiziune	1950s
Radio-TV	1960s–70s
Tele-Radio	1980s
Panoramic Radio-TV	1990s

==== United Kingdom ====
Publication	Dates of operation
Film & TV Week	1997
TV easy	2005–2014
TV Pick	2013
TV Plus	1991
TV Quick	1991–2010
What Satellite and Digital TV	1986–2014

==== United States ====
Publication	Years of operation
The Cable Guide	1989–2012
Total TV	1986–1998

== List of TV listings websites ==
=== Current ===
==== Australia ====
Freeview.com.au	2008	Freeview
On TV Tonight (also distributed in the United States, Canada, and British Isles)	2014	On TV Tonight Pty Ltd.
OurGuide	2002	Ourguide Pty Ltd.
TV Tonight	2007	TV Tonight, LLC
YourTV.com.au		Nine Digital Pty Ltd"
Website	Year of launch	Current owner

==== Canada ====
Website	Year of launch	Current owner
TVPassport (also distributed in the United States)	2016	TV Media Inc.

==== France ====
Website	Year of launch	Current owner
TVcesoir.fr	2023	On TV Tonight

==== Italy ====
Website	Year of launch	Current owner
TVDaily.it	2012	Anicaflash
Guida.tv	2023	On TV Tonight

==== Philippines ====
Website	Year of launch	Current owner
ClickTheCity.com	2004	Surf Shop, Inc.

==== South Korea ====
Website	Year of launch	Current owner
TVDaily.asiae.co.kr	2006	

==== Sweden ====
Website	Year of launch	Current owner
tv.nu	2007	Schibsted Media Group

==== United Kingdom ====
Website	Year of launch	Current owner
OnTheBox	2002	Olderiswiser Media Limited
TVGuide.co.uk	2004	TVGuide.co.uk Ltd TV Listings
YO.TV	2009	TVGuide.co.uk Ltd TV Listings
MyTelly.co.uk	2023	On TV Tonight

==== United States ====
Website	Year of launch	Current owner
TV Guide	1996	Fandom
TitanTV	2001	TitanTV, Inc.
TVTV.us (also distributed in Canada)	2016	

=== Defunct ===
==== Canada ====
Website	Years of operation
TV Guide	2006–2012

==== United Kingdom ====
Website	Years of operation
Tank Top TV	2006–2016

==== United States ====
Website	Years of operation	
Couchville	2007–2008	
MeeVee	2005–2009	
TVplanner	2006–2010	
Zap2It (also distributed in Canada)	2000–25	Tribune Digital Ventures/Gracenote
