= Black Jack, Kansas =

Unincorporated community in Kansas, U.S.

Coordinates: 38°46′04″N 95°06′57″W

Black Jack is an unincorporated community in Douglas County, Kansas, United States.

== History ==
The Battle of Black Jack was fought near Black Jack Creek in 1856. Black Jack was founded in 1857, and named after nearby Black Jack Creek. The creek was named for the Blackjack Oak trees along its course. A post office was established at Black Jack in 1858, and remained in operation until 1895.
