= DigiGuide =

UK digital TV guide

Digiguide
- Developer(s): GipsyMedia Limited
- Initial release: 6 April 1999
- Stable release: 8.5 / Jun 2010
- Operating system: Microsoft Windows
- Type: Electronic program guide
- License: Proprietary software
- Website: digiguide.tv

Digiguide is a digital TV guide in the UK. The last stable release was 8.5 in 2010 and live customer support is not available for the products; the online product content has not been updated since.

== Features ==
Digiguide is available as a PC desktop app and a web-based guide. It supports listings for many of the UK channels, and encourages broadcasters to join the service at no cost to them. The program can also import listings for channels from other countries in various formats (for example XMLTV) using a converter. Users can also create and share their own listings.

The software used to be available as a 30-day free trial, however, it was reduced to 7 days sometime in 2011. After the free trial it is paid for by subscription. It operates a referral programme, with the incentive of subscription extensions for successful referrals.

The functions of Digiguide are also available using a browser and on portable devices via the separate myDigiGuide.com service.

The Digiguide TV and radio listings data, in a variety of formats and time zones, is available as a corporate service.

Digiguide and its holding company GipsyMedia were purchased in 2010 by EBS New Media Limited, a company that specialised in producing TV schedules and EPG services for many TV channels worldwide. At that time, the Digiguide team was based in Exmouth, Devon. EBS New Media was bought by the PA Media Group in 2018 and is part of the pa tv metadata brand.

== Criticism ==
Controversy arose when an early, free, advertising supported, version included Conducent Timesink advertising software. After removing this software, following customer complaints, Digiguide moved to a pure subscription business model.
