= IArchives, Inc. =

Internet company

iArchives, Inc.
- Type: Private (subsidiary of Ancestry.com)
- Industry: Historical documents
- Predecessor: Automated Solutions, Inc.
- Founded: November 22, 1994
- Founder: Mark A. Kendell; David G. Norton
- Fate: Acquired
- Headquarters: Lindon, Utah, United States
- Area served: Worldwide
- Key people: Brian Hansen; (general manager); Scott Christensen; (vice president); Robert Wille; (chief engineer)
- Parent: Ancestry.com LLC
- Website: iarchives.com

iArchives, Inc., formerly Automated Solutions, Inc., was an dotcom company based in Lindon, Utah, United States. iArchives was acquired on October 21, 2010 by Ancestry.com, Inc., where it was merged with Ancestry's other inhouse and purchased archive holdings. Since at least 2019, Ancestry's archive service is called Newspapers.com.
