= TV Time =

Social television network service

- Website type: TV tracker, social network
- Available in: Multilingual
- Owner: Whip Media
- Registration: Free
- Launched: May 11, 2011; 15 years ago
- Current status: Discontinued as of July 15, 2026

TV Time
- Final release: 10.11
- Operating system: iOS, Android
- Website: www.tvtime.com

TV Time (formerly TVShow Time) is a discontinued tracking platform and social television network for television shows and films, available in app and desktop forms. Using TheTVDB as a data source, it allows users to store information about their media consumption and post reviews.

On July 1, 2026, TV Time announced that its website and app would be discontinued on July 15, 2026.

== History ==
Company Timeline
| 2011 | TV Time launches as TVShow Time in Paris, France. |
| 2016 | Whip Networks, a Santa Monica, California based company, acquires TVShow Time. |
| 2017 | TVShow Time rebrands as TV Time. |
| 2018 | TV Time launches TVLytics, an insights platform for media companies. |
| 2019 | TV Time acquires its online metadata source, TheTVDB. |
| 2019 | TV Time adds a films section. |
| 2019 | TV Time acquires Mediamorph. |
| 2026 | TV Time announces that it would discontinue its services. |

== Features ==
Every registered TV Time user had their own profile. When a user opened the app, four tabs appeared at the bottom of the screen: Shows, Movies, Discover and Profile.

=== Shows ===
- Watch List: A list of show posters or thumbnails with episode descriptions (depending on a user's preference). On this feature, users can see what shows to watch next, what they had not seen in a while, and their watch history based on which shows they have added to their Watch List. In the poster view, a yellow progress bar that illustrates the user's progression on a show. This tab also allows one to mark an episode as "watched". In the thumbnail view, users have the option to swipe right or press the check mark next to the episode description. In the poster view, users click the check mark within the episode pages.
- Show Pages: Once an episode is marked as watched, individual episode pages reveal comments from the TV Time community and gives the ability to rate the episode, express feelings, and vote for favorite characters. The feature had a "no spoiler rule", so unless a user has marked the episode as watched, this content would remain hidden.
- Upcoming: The "Upcoming" section works as a reminder for future episodes of shows a user has followed. Users also had the option to receive notifications an hour before a show airs.

=== Movies ===
- Watch List: Similar to the Shows tab, a list of movie posters appears. On this feature, users can movies they have added to their Watch List. This tab also allows one to mark an episode as watched by going into the movie and selecting the check mark next to the movie description.
- Movie Pages: Movie Pages allow users to rate the film, express feelings, and vote for favorite characters. The "no spoiler rule" applies here as well if a user has not marked the movie as watched, comments posted by the TV Time community would also be hidden.
- Upcoming: The "Upcoming" list features movies a user has added to their Watch List that had not been released.

=== Discover ===
The app offers an explore feature which allows users to discover new shows according to different criterion, such as genre and popularity.

- Search/Discover More: The search bar allowed users find shows, movies, and other users within TV Time. If a user does not know what to watch next, they have the option of using the "Discover More" feature. This section has genre filtering capabilities, show status options (ongoing or ended), and trending series (featuring popular shows and films or shows frequently binge-watched).
- Recommendations: The "Top Shows for You" field displays programming that a user may want to add to their Watch List based on genres and shows that they enjoy.
- Trending: "Trending Shows & Movies" features popular programs on TV Time based on the number of user comments within three days while "Recent Activity" displays series that a users' in-app friends are following.

=== Profile ===
- Stats: The top of a user's profile features certain stats, such as how much time the user has spent watching television, known as their "TV Time" on the service. This clock shows an estimated amount of time a user has spent watching television. The accumulated time is based on the episodes marked as watched and their duration. This is also available for movies in the "Movie Time" section. The top also features a number of episodes and movies watched by a user, which is based on the number of episodes a user has marked as watched. Another "Stats" option at the bottom of the profile allows a user to search graphs, badges, and rankings.
- Show & Movie Lists: A user's profile displays recent shows and films that they have tracked. A profile may also show off lists of favorite shows and films if the user has chosen to do so. Users also have the option to combine both movies and television series with "custom lists".
- Badges: Another characteristic of the profile is the display of badges. Badges are rewards that every user received when using TV Time. They are divided in two main categories: discovery badges and addiction badges. Discovery badges are given when the user makes use of the site's features for the first time. Addiction badges are given to the user when they interact with television shows.

=== Languages ===
TV Time was available in fourteen languages: Arabic, Dutch, English, French, German, Italian, Japanese, Korean, Polish, Brazilian Portuguese, Portuguese, Russian, Spanish and Turkish. Users are able to filter their preferred languages in the app so that only comments and reactions from the community in the languages they choose could be shown.

== Reception ==
Media outlets noted interest in TV Time's service as an analytics tool in the era of streaming, which makes it difficult to prove a television series' popularity and viewership since streaming services do not necessarily make that information public. In 2018, Variety cited the website's TVLytics data as one of the reasons for Netflix to sign a $100M deal with Warner Bros. Television to maintain the American sitcom Friends on its online library until 2019. The same year, United Talents Agency signed a deal with TV Time that granted them access to their data, in an effort to gain a deeper understanding into the content audiences were engaging with the most and how they were consuming it. According to TV Time CEO Richard Rosenblatt this would allow them to recognize shows that could be popular or frequently binge-watched.

Some actors such as Álvaro Morte and Omar Sy have shown interest in TV Time's statistics on social media, with Morte reacting to his character on the Spanish television series Money Heist being featured in the Top 10 Most Voted Character of 2020 and Sy reacting to the French television series Lupin being number 1 on the Most Binged TV Series list on the week of its release.

=== Awards ===
In 2021, TV Time won "Best Entertainment App" at the Webby Awards in the "People's Voice" category.

== Database ==
TV Time used TheTVDB's database as a source of information for all shows and movies in its library. Initially an independent website, The TVDB was acquired by TV Time in 2019. Users can edit information about television series such as characters, airing dates, networks and more on this database if they have a registered account.

== See also ==
- Tvtag – Social networking website and mobile app; also dedicated to television
