= Henry Clay Pate =

American pro-slavery soldier (1833–1864)

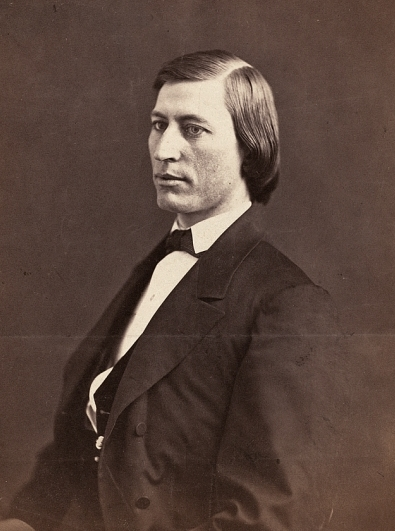
- Pate c. 1855
- Born: April 21, 1833; Bedford County, Virginia, U.S.
- Died: May 11, 1864 (aged 31) Henrico County, Virginia, U.S.
- Cause of death: Killed in action
- Allegiance: United States; Confederate States of America
- Branch: U.S. Marshals Service; Confederate States Army
- Service years: 1855–1859 (U.S. Marshal); 1861–1864 (CSA)
- Rank: Captain
- Commands: Pate's Rangers / Petersburg Rangers; Letcher Mounted Guards
- Battles / wars: See list: Bleeding Kansas; Battle of Black Jack; American Civil War; Battle of Yellow Tavern
- Other work: Newspaper publisher (Westport Border Star)

Henry Clay Pate (April 21, 1833 – May 11, 1864) was an American writer, newspaper publisher and soldier. A strong advocate of slavery, he was a border ruffian in the "Bleeding Kansas" unrest. He is best known for his conflict with, and capture by, the abolitionist John Brown.

== Early life ==
Pate was born in Bedford County, Virginia, on April 21, 1833 to Edmund Pate (a veteran of the War of 1812) and his wife Sarah. He began his studies at the University of Virginia in 1848, but left two years later without completing a degree. After leaving the university, he lived for a time in Cincinnati, where he worked as a writer, before moving to Kansas.

== Bleeding Kansas ==
Kansas in the 1850s was wracked by violent confrontations between pro-slavery and abolitionist factions. Pate was firmly in the former camp. He published the Westport Border Star, a pro-slavery newspaper, and became Justice of the Peace of Kaw Township, Jackson County, Missouri, in 1855. Pate was part of the sacking of Lawrence and, either during or shortly before, was commissioned as a Deputy United States Marshal. On hearing news of John Brown's actions at the Pottawatomie Massacre, Pate set out with a band of thirty men to hunt Brown down. During the hunt for Brown, two of his sons (Jason and John Junior) were captured (either by Pate or another marshal), charged with murder, and thrown in irons.

Brown's retaliation was swift and decisive. Pate's company was encamped along the Santa Fe Trail in Douglas County, Kansas. At dawn on June 2, 1856, Brown and a small group of fellow abolitionists attacked, leading to an intense, three-hour battle that became known as the Battle of Black Jack. Despite their numerical inferiority, the Free State men prevailed, with several of Pate's men fleeing the battle and the rest captured. Pate surrendered unconditionally after Brown had rejected an earlier attempt at conditional surrender.

As it was put by Frederick Douglass:

With only eight men he met, fought, whipped, and captured Henry Clay Pate with twenty-five well-armed and well-mounted men. In this battle he selected his ground so wisely, handled his men so skillfully, and attacked his enemies so vigorously, that they could neither run nor fight, and were therefore compelled to surrender to a force less than one-third their own.

Governor Shannon sent a detachment of federal troops under the command of Col. Edwin Sumner to free Pate and his men. When Pate requested to stand and make some remarks, Sumner cut him off by saying, "I don't want to hear a word from you, sir. You have no business here, the Governor told me so." Pate and his men then left the scene. Accompanying Sumner was Lieutenant J. E. B. Stuart, with whom Pate later served in the Civil War. Regarding his defeat and capture at Black Jack, Pate remarked, "I went to take Old Brown, and Old Brown took me."

Pate's entanglement with John Brown did not end with his release at Black Jack. Brown took Pate's Bowie knife as a trophy, using it as a prop in his speeches and later providing it as a model for the heads of the pikes that were to be distributed to freed slaves after the raid on Harpers Ferry.

== Visit to Brown in Charles Town jail ==
After Brown's capture, Pate came 175 miles (282 km) from his home in Petersburg, Virginia, to Charles Town to see him. They prepared a statement, witnessed by jailor Capt. John Avis and two others, about events at the Battle of Black Jack, somewhat defending Pate, whom Brown said "gave him the hardest fight he had in Kansas".

Brown was hanged on December 2. On December 7, Pate gave a lecture on Brown at Cooper Union. "Mr. Pate said a great many things favorable to himself and a great many derogatory to Brown."

== Civil War service and death ==
With the outbreak of the Civil War, Pate (then residing in Petersburg, Virginia) raised and equipped a mounted company. This unit, known variously as Pate's Rangers, the Letcher Mounted Guards or the Petersburg Rangers, was equipped with small arms from the Gosport Navy Yard that had been thrown into the river by departing federal troops. Pate also designed a revolving cannon with which to equip his unit. His company was attached to Wise's Legion and sent to western Virginia. Pate later served under Thomas L. Rosser when the latter was placed in charge of the 5th Virginia Cavalry. Rosser viewed Pate as uncooperative and insubordinate and had him court-martialed, but Pate was exonerated.

Pate died at the Battle of Yellow Tavern on May 11, 1864. He had been charged by General J. E. B. Stuart to hold his position until reinforcements arrived. During the second wave of the battle, Pate held his position as ordered, before being killed by a bullet to the temple.
