= Battle of Black Jack =

Armed engagement of the Bleeding Kansas conflict

- Part of Bleeding Kansas
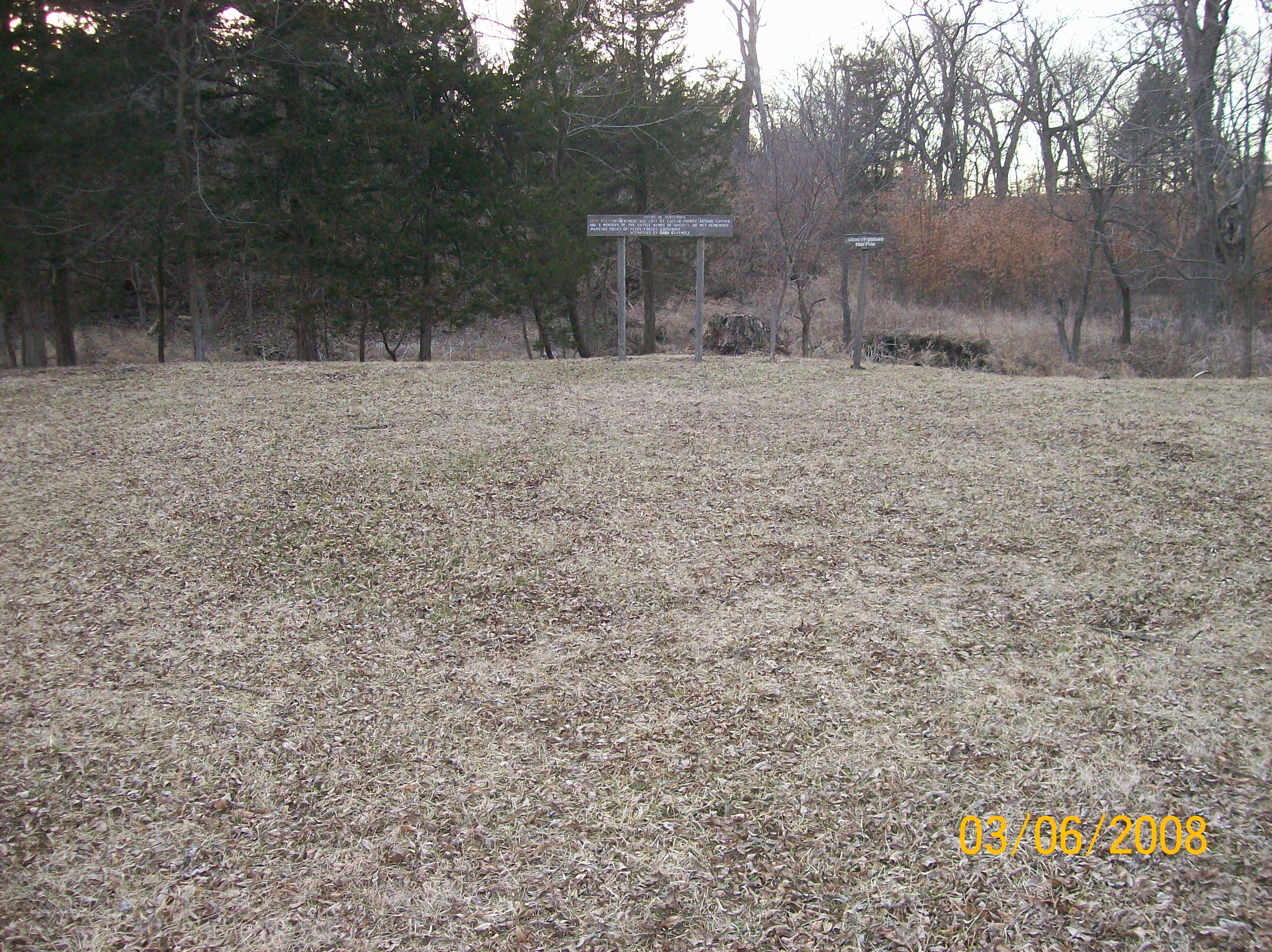
- A sign showing the surrender point of Henry Pate on the Black Jack battle site
Date	June 2, 1856; 170 years ago
Location	Palmyra Township, Douglas County, Kansas, near Baldwin City, Kansas
Result	Free-Stater victory

Belligerents
Free-State Abolitionists	Border ruffians

Commanders and leaders
John Brown; Samuel T. Shore	Henry C. Pate (POW); Lieut. Brockett

Strength
30	75–80

Casualties and losses
Unknown	29 prisoners

- Black Jack Battlefield
- U.S. National Register of Historic Places
- U.S. National Historic Landmark
- Location within Kansas Location within the United States
- Location: near Baldwin City, Kansas
- Coordinates: 38°45′42″N 95°7′50″W
- Area: 59 acres (24 ha)
- NRHP reference No.: 04000365 (original); 04001373 (increase)

Significant dates
- Added to NRHP: April 28, 2004
- Boundary increase: June 6, 2005
- Designated NHL: October 16, 2012

The Battle of Black Jack took place on June 2, 1856, when antislavery forces, led by the noted abolitionist John Brown, attacked the encampment of Henry C. Pate near Baldwin City, Kansas. The battle is cited as one incident of "Bleeding Kansas" and a contributing factor leading up to the American Civil War of 1861 to 1865.

== Background ==
In 1854, the U.S. Congress had passed the Kansas-Nebraska Act which stipulated that the residents of these territories would decide whether they wished to enter the Union as a slave or free state. This doctrine became known as popular sovereignty. Organized groups from the North sent thousands of abolitionist supporters to Kansas in an attempt to tip the balance in favor of free state advocates, to counter settlement from pro-slavery supporters from Missouri. As a result, pro- and antislavery groups had frequent clashes culminating in the Battle of Black Jack.

On May 21, 1856, Henry Clay Pate participated with a posse of 750 pro-slavery forces in the sacking of Lawrence. The next day, Congressman Preston Brooks from South Carolina physically attacked Senator Charles Sumner of Massachusetts in the Senate chambers. Three days later, a band of men, led by John Brown and comrade Captain Shore, executed five pro-slavery men with broadswords at Pottawatomie Creek. This incident became known as the Pottawatomie massacre.

In response to the massacre, Pate, recently granted the title of "Deputy United States Marshal", set out with a pro-slavery militia to either capture or kill John Brown. They took prisoner two of Brown's sons (John Brown Jr. and Jason), as well as some other Free-State men.

== Battle ==
On June 1, 1856, six of Pate's men led a raid on two locations: Palmyra and Prairie City. At Palmyra, they successfully took several prisoners, but at Prairie City they suffered two wounded and retreated back to Pate's camp. At about 10pm, Brown's party set out to find Pate's men, and discovered their camp in a grove near the town of Black Jack the next morning.

Brown and his men dismounted at a distance of roughly 200–300 yards (180–270 m) from Pate's camp. Brown (armed with a revolver) and Shore led their men in the approach to the camp, opening fire once within range of the Sharps rifles carried by Shore's men. After a period of sustained fire by the Free-State forces, Pate offered a conditional surrender in which they would retain their arms, which Brown rejected.

Pate's men slowly began to mount their horses in an attempt to retreat, but six of them had their horses shot down. Eventually, a second flag of truce was raised, this time with an offer of unconditional surrender accepted by Brown.

At the end of the three-hour battle, Pate and 28 of his men were taken prisoner.

Brown later referred to the event as "the first regular battle between free-state and pro-slavery forces in Kansas".

== Pate's 1859 interview of Brown ==
During the month between John Brown's death sentence and his execution, Pate traveled to Charles Town from his home in Petersburg, Virginia to interview him, and prepare a joint statement, witnessed by jailor John Avis, that Pate had printed.

== Town of Black Jack ==
The town of Black Jack was established in 1855 as a trail town on the Santa Fe Trail. The town became incorporated in 1857 and the threat of border warfare was still a problem in Black Jack. At its peak, Black Jack contained a tavern, post office, blacksmiths, a hotel, general store, doctor's office, schools and two churches but by the end of the Civil War, Santa Fe traffic began to dwindle and soon the town was abandoned.

== Legacy ==
The site of the battle is located near U.S. Highway 56, about three miles (5 km) east of Baldwin City, and is partially within Robert Hall Pearson Memorial Park, designated by the state of Kansas in honor of one of Brown and Shore's fighters who gave a handwritten account of the battle. Signs placed throughout the battle site point out where the battle began and ended. Efforts are underway to preserve both the Pearson Memorial Park and the Ivan Boyd Prairie Preserve across the road.

In 1970, to commemorate the 100th anniversary of the founding of Baldwin City, Baker University professor and playwright Don Mueller (not to be confused with the baseball player of the same name) and Phyllis E. Braun, Business Manager, produced a musical play entitled The Ballad of Black Jack to tell the story of the events that led up to the battle. The Ballad of Black Jack played as part of the city's Maple Leaf Festival from 1970 to 1983 and again from 2001 to 2005. It also played in nearby Lawrence in 1986 and in 2006 and 2007 as a part of Lawrence's Civil War On The Western Frontier program. The play returned to Lawrence in 2021 after a 14-year hiatus.

In 2012 the National Park Service designated the battlefield a National Historic Landmark.

== See also ==
- List of battles fought in Kansas
- List of National Historic Landmarks in Kansas
- National Register of Historic Places listings in Douglas County, Kansas
- Pate's visit to Brown in the Charles Town jail
