= Ancestry Magazine =

Genealogy magazine

- Executive Editor: Loretto (Lou) Dennis Szucs, FUGA
- Staff writers: Contributors Donn Devine, CG, CGL; Colleen Fitzpatrick, Ph.D. Myra Vanderpool Gormley, CG; Janet Bernice Jeys; Tana L. Pedersen; Jeanie Croasmun; Jennifer Utley; Jana Lloyd Porter; Betty Kreisel Shubert; Juliana Szucs Smith; Megan Smolenyak Smolenyak; Paula Stuart-Warren, CG; Howard Wolinsky Past Contributors Amy Johnson Crow; Russ Hannig; Roseann Reinemuth Hogan, Ph.D. Kurt Laird; Marie McFadden; Laura Prescott; Paul Rawlins; Matthew Rayback; Beau Sharbrough; Chris Trainor; Anastasia Sutherland Tyler; Terry and Jim Willard; Curt B. Witcher, FUGA; Matthew Wright; Jennifer Browning; Rob Davis; Lisa Salazar
- Categories: Genealogy
- Frequency: Bimonthly
- Circulation: 64,009 (Sept. 2008)
- Publisher: Ancestry.com
- First issue: January 1994
- Final issue Number: March/April 2010 vol. 28, no. 2
- Company: Ancestry.com Operations Inc.
- Country: United States
- Based in: Provo, Utah
- Language: English
- ISSN: 1075-475X

Ancestry Newsletter
- Categories: Genealogy
- Frequency: Bimonthly
- First issue: 1983
- Final issue Number: March / April 2010 vol. 11, no. 6
- Company: Ancestry Incorporated
- Country: United States
- Based in: Provo, Utah
- Language: English
- ISSN: 0749-5927

Ancestry Magazine was a general interest genealogy magazine owned by Ancestry.com Operations Inc. The magazine received a 2009 Gold Eddie Award in the enthusiast category for its article, The Man (or Woman) Who Would Be King. Eddie awards are granted annually by Folio magazine for excellence in editorial content. The headquarters was in Provo, Utah.

The magazine began as Ancestry Newsletter, a small, genealogy-industry newsletter in 1983, and became a four-color, 68-page, glossy print, bimonthly publication in 1994. After more than 25 years in print, the magazine was discontinued with the March/April 2010 issue.

In mid-2009, Ancestry magazine began making its past issues available online at Google Books and at its website.
