= Twitter Amplify =

Video advertising product

Twitter Amplify is a video advertising product that Twitter launched for media companies and consumer brands in May 2013. The product gives broadcasters the opportunity to publish real-time in-tweet video clips that are accompanied by pre-roll or post-roll advertisements. It is Twitter's major initiative in social television, designed to enhance the user experience with premium and timely TV highlights, enable broadcasters to reach new audiences and provide brands with a cross-platform tool for reaching the social conversation around major events.

Twitter Amplify allows the social network to profit further from the growth in digital video advertising, which is growing many times faster than TV, search, and most other digital ad markets. Online video ad revenue will reach nearly $5 billion in 2016, up from $2.8 billion in 2013, while TV ad revenue will decline by nearly 3% per year during the same time period. Analysis by Credit Suisse puts the average cost per thousand impressions (CPM) for a digital video advertisement at $24.60 rising up to $32.80 for those with interactive ad units or mobile formats – versus $2.66 for display formats.

== Mechanics ==
Twitter Amplify allows broadcasters and rights holders to share live TV clips and video content into Twitter in real-time, giving users the opportunity to watch the social videos without leaving Twitter. For instance, if a television company purchased time on the platform, it can promote its prime-time shows and earn advertising revenue at the same time. During a show's broadcast, Twitter Amplify can send a barrage of tweets with rich media and interactive contents such as video clips and audience polls to drive people to the program. The content could include sponsor messages in the form of pre-roll ads. It is also a viral video format, as Twitter users retweet their favourite clips and push them out to their own followers, extending the reach of the videos more broadly. Twitter Amplify also allows content owners to use paid media support from sponsors and advertising partners to fund the distribution of their content across Twitter.

=== Discovery and distribution ===
One of the challenges when distributing (and consuming) video on Twitter is that many consumers have fast feeds. Twitter Amplify makes it possible to pin the social video tweet to the visible part of the feed so the user is more likely to see it and engage with it. Moreover, if a broadcaster sends a tweet from its own Twitter account, it can target only the people that are following that account (i.e. its "organic reach"). However, when a sponsor runs a paid campaign with Twitter Amplify, it can also target anyone tweeting about that topic or content at that time, or any other user who may be interested in the content (because they have followed a relevant account, tweeted against a particular hashtag or discussed an associated topic in their feed) – rather than being restricted to its own Twitter followers. Broadcasters and rights holders can therefore ensure their video tweets are seen and use paid media distribution (Twitter Amplify) to extend this reach to a much wider and relevant demographic. This audience can be many times the size of their existing, organic reach – potentially the entire audience of Twitter.

=== Extending viral distribution ===
Paid media Amplify campaigns encourage extended viral video distribution as Twitter users (that do not follow the broadcaster or rights holder directly) discover these new video tweets in their feed, pushed to them via promoted tweets, and share them with their own followers. This drives a second wave of viral distribution and greater earned media value for the broadcaster and brand.

=== Ad-funded distribution ===
By enabling broadcasters to have this extended social reach paid for by a brand sponsor, Twitter Amplify represents an ad-funded distribution model for content.

== Partners ==
When it was launched, Twitter also announced it would work with a number of media companies, including Time Inc., Bloomberg Television, Discovery Channel, Vevo, Vice Media, Condé Nast Entertainment and Warner Music Group. By February 2014, all four major U.S. TV networks had signed up to the Amplify program, bringing a variety of TV content onto the social platform, in the form of real-time video clips. In March 2014, ITV became the first major broadcaster in the UK to sign up to Twitter Amplify, and BSkyB followed suit in October 2014, having been sharing video on the platform since 2013. At this time, Twitter Amplify was live in 10 countries and had more than 70 partners, including the BBC.

Twitter and its media partners are believed to be making significant revenue from its Twitter Amplify program. According to an industry source, McDonald's, Verizon and Microsoft paid seven figures each to sponsor the NFL's Amplify videos and to promote the tweets. By bringing more premium content on its platform, it also hopes to drive growth of its user base. Twitter acquired its Twitter Amplify partner in the U.S., SnappyTV, as part of its ongoing efforts to be the leader in social television. The company was helping broadcasters and rights holders to share video content both organically across social and via Twitter's Amplify program.

== Recent developments ==
In 2016, Twitter expanded Amplify by opening it to individual publishers. Under this new feature, users can earn a portion of the revenue if they choose to include a pre-roll ad when sharing a video content.

Initially, Twitter only allowed in-stream video ads to clips and livestreams to advertisers that have been white-listed via Twitter Amplify, but in June 2018, this feature became open to all advertisers through the application's self-serve ad tool. By September of the same year, the company also began placing video contents and livestream atop Twitter users' timeline, giving them more prominent exposure.
