= Murder of George Seitz =

1976 murder in New York City

George Clarence Seitz
- Born: December 12, 1894; Long Island City, New York
- Disappeared: December 10, 1976 (aged 81); Jamaica, New York City, U.S.
- Cause of death: Homicide
- Body discovered: Queens, New York City
- Known for: Cold-case homicide victim identified through genetic investigation 45 years after his murder

George "Clarence" Seitz (December 12, 1894 – December 10, 1976) was an American World War I military veteran, who was murdered in the neighborhood of Jamaica in New York City on December 10, 1976. Police recovered his remains 43 years later, and arrested his murderer in 2021.

== Disappearance ==
The victim was a World War I veteran who went by "Clarence". He was reported missing after leaving his house to get a haircut; at the time, Seitz was 81 years old.

== Investigation ==
There were no leads and the investigation was placed in the cold cases file, abandoned for decades. However, in early 2019, a woman in her 50s informed the police that as an 11-year-old girl, she had seen her mother's companion dismember and bury a body. The police used dogs to scour the property where she had lived at the time, and found human remains, but were unable to identify the victim. Only the pelvis and part of the torso were found.

=== Identification of victim ===
Using material from the remains, investigators generated a genetic profile. Two years later, still unable to identify Seitz as the victim, the FBI were called upon, as well as an external forensic genealogy laboratory, Othram. Detectives were then able to find close relatives and identified Seitz through DNA samples.

=== Arrest, plea, and sentencing ===
Investigators identified the man mentioned by the informant as Martin Motta. He and his brother had owned the barbershop, where Seitz visited when he disappeared, located only a few city blocks from Seitz' home. He was arrested, arraigned, and indicted by a grand jury in November 2021.

Motta pled guilty in October 2022, and was sentenced to 20 years in prison on November 7.

== See also ==
- List of solved missing person cases
