= Australian TV Guide =

The Australian TV Guide was the first online television schedule guide published in Australia, and one of the first online electronic program guides in the world.

Created in 1994 by Professor Lesley Goldschlager of Monash University and his internet company Sofcom, a pioneering producer of online content in Australia in the 1990s, the Australian TV Guide was the first publication in Australia to provide internet users with a local and searchable online television guide.

It was initially supported by all major Australian television networks, except for the Seven Network, which came on board in later years. The first guides produced only covered the major capital cities of Australia. In November 1999, Sofcom introduced schedules for regional Australia.

The Australian TV Guide was supported by online advertising and syndication of its listings, providing content to portal sites such as Yahoo, Bigpond and LookSmart.

In 2003, the Australian TV Guide was acquired by eBroadcast Pty Limited and later syndicated to other television sites such as OurGuide and the Australian Broadcasting Corporation. It also introduced pay TV listings into its program guide, including daily schedules for Foxtel, Fetch TV and TransACT.

In 2014 eBroadcast Pty Limited expanded into the United States and later into Canada and the United Kingdom with a spin-off site called On TV Tonight, producing electronic program guides for international channels and audiences outside of Australia.
