= Reunion (genealogy software) =

Genealogy software

- Original author: Frank Leister
- Developer: Leister Productions
- Release: 1988; 38 years ago
- Stable release: 14.0 / 5 March 2024; 2 years ago
- Operating system: macOS, iOS
- Available in: Multilingual (6)
- Type: Genealogy software
- License: Proprietary
- Website: www.leisterpro.com

Reunion is genealogy software made by Leister Productions, Inc., a privately held firm established by Frank Leister in 1984 located in Mechanicsburg, Pennsylvania. The company operates as a genealogy (family tree) software developer exclusively for macOS and iOS. Reunion was initially a Macintosh application, programmed in Apple's HyperCard. Version 4 was available for Windows and Macintosh until the Windows version was sold to Sierra in 1997.

Reunion provides methods to create, manipulate and generate reports about a family history. It has the capability to produce charts depicting family relationships and the ability to produce Web pages for publishing a family history online. Reunion can also be used to gather family statistics. It allows integration of images and movies into Reunion family files.

== Reunion version history ==
The announcement pages for the respective versions offer more details as to the exact changes.

Reunion 14 was released in early 2024. New features include support for GEDCOM 7.0 and concurrently the ability to link media files to events, facts and marriages. It also includes more options for publishing reports, charts, and websites.

Reunion 13 was announced in November 2020. Updates added MacOS Big Sur support and native support for Apple M1 CPUs.

Reunion 12 was updated in May 2018. New features include a new Duplicate Check, further improvements to syncing with Reunion's mobile app "ReunionTouch" for iOS, a new Citations List, improvements to Sorting, and a number of other upgrades.

Reunion 11 was announced in April 2015. New features include better syncing with Reunion's mobile app, Book creator to automatically generate PDF books, improved editing, and "on-the-fly" relationships identification.

Reunion 10 was announced in May 2012. New features include web searching, mapping of places, a tree view, a nav bar and a sidebar, image dragging from a web browser, side-by-side matching and merging people, and graphic relationship charts.

Reunion 9 was announced in March 2007. This version became a universal binary Cocoa-based application, which runs under OS X. New features include Unicode support and a less "modal" design, allowing index and source windows to remain open for easier access.

Reunion 8 was announced in September 2002. This version became a Mac OS X native application, providing users of OS X and prior versions of the Macintosh operating system the ability to utilize the software. Charting was significantly enhanced with the move to Reunion 8.

Reunion 7 was announced in May 2000 and among the changes seen at this time was the integration of SuperChart into a single Reunion application and the ability to have multiple family files open at one time.

Reunion 6 was announced in November 1998 and saw the genealogy software change to include pictures into the family card view and introduced the Match & Merge tool that can be used to detect and remove duplicate records in the family file.

Reunion 5 was announced in September 1997 and saw the introduction of drag and drop capabilities when working with the family card. Editing also became easier with start of tabbed windows to allow for faster, more efficient data entry.

Reunion 4 was the last version available for Windows.

== Languages ==
- English
- The following translations have been completed by Reunion users:
  - Dutch
  - French
  - German
  - Norwegian
  - Swedish

== External Tools ==
- Third party utilities/add-ons - for Reunion.
