= Grabyo =

- Company type: Private
- Founded: 2013
- Headquarters: London, UK
- Area served: Worldwide
- Founder: Will Neale
- Key people: Gareth Capon (CEO), Will Neale (Founder)
- Industry: Internet
- Current status: Active

Grabyo is a browser-based live video production suite integrated with other social media platforms such as Facebook, YouTube, Instagram, Snapchat, Twitter, and Periscope. Sports federations and media companies use cloud-based technology to produce professional-quality live streams and video clips for digital audiences.

Founded in 2013, the company produces and distributes live shows (such as sports or music events) and video clips (such as pre-match warm-ups, behind-the-scene activities, and instant highlights). It is used to build digital fan bases, drive TV audiences and generate revenue from third-party sponsors and pay-TV subscriptions. Its customers include major sports rights owners and media companies such as La Liga, NHL, Eurosport, Sky Sports, FIFA World Cup, FIA Formula E Championship, The Championships, Wimbledon, the Premier League and Real Madrid C.F.

Grabyo ranked 77th in the Financial Times' FT 1000 Europe's Fastest Growing Companies 2018.

== Investors ==
The company's investors include Oliver Slipper, Nicole Junkermann, Cesc Fàbregas, Thierry Henry, Robin van Persie and Tony Parker.
