= Tvtag =

Social networking website and mobile app

tvtag
- Website type: Second screen social networking
- Available in: English
- Founded: June 2010
- Dissolved: January 1, 2015
- Predecessor: GetGlue
- Country of origin: United States
- Area served: Worldwide
- Owner: i.TV
- Founder: Alex Iskold (GetGlue)
- CEO: Alex Iskold
- Website: tvtag.com
- Commercial: Yes
- Registration: Required
- Users: ~4 million
- Launched: December 2005 (as GetGlue)
- Current status: Offline

tvtag (formerly GetGlue) was a social networking website and mobile app for television fans. Users "check into" the shows, movies and sports that they consumed using a website, mobile website, or mobile app.

GetGlue's service was launched in June 2010, with headquarters in New York City. In November 2013, GetGlue was acquired by second screen company i.TV. Mashable called the merger “a solid meld between two platforms with similar goals — helping users find and engage with the best TV content — but different strengths.”

In January 2014, GetGlue changed its name to tvtag. Along with the new name the site also got a "new look, feel, and direction". The website and app received an update. The color scheme changed from blue to red. The new experience allowed users to "check in, unlock digital stickers, comment, doodle, and react to TV moments with other fans while watching [their] favorite shows".

On December 19, 2014, in an email to users and a posting on their website, tvtag announced that they "will be shutting down tvtag and its supporting apps in order to refocus our efforts on other initiatives." The site was offering users a way to retrieve their usage data via email. The statement did leave the door open for either a new app or a return of tvtag.

== Features ==
After checking in, users received points and earned virtual stickers, received recommendations, and can earn discounts for entertainment companies.

Since March 2011, GetGlue included Foursquare check-ins, enabling users to say what they're watching and where.

Users could also request physical versions of the stickers they earned online to be mailed to them at no cost, although limited to a batch of no more than twenty each month, though in November 2013, this functionality was removed.

== Partnerships ==
GetGlue's partners included 20th Century Fox, The CW, AMC, ABC Family, Disney Theatrical Productions, Discovery Channel, ESPN, FOX Network, Food Network, HBO, HGTV, MTV, MSNBC, Penguin Books, PBS, WWE, Random House, Showtime, Simon & Schuster, Syfy, Sony Pictures, Travel Channel, USA Network, Universal Pictures, and Warner Bros. theatrical.

In September 2011, GetGlue partnered with DirecTV to enable users to check in via on-screen controls, its first partnership with a pay-TV service. Users also saw their friends' streams and were able to switch to their channels.

== Growth ==
In January 2011, the service accumulated nearly 10 times that figure with 12.1 million check-ins and ratings. On February 27, 2011, GetGlue saw over 31,000 check-ins at the Oscars. In June 2011, the record for Most Check-Ins to a TV show was broken during the premiere of True Blood Season 4 on HBO. Over 38,000 people checked in and earned a sticker. The record was broken yet again by the season 2 premiere of "Once Upon a Time", with 93,774 check-ins.

In August 2012, GetGlue announced it has reached three million users, adding one million users since January 2012. GetGlue users had contributed a total of 500 million check-ins, likes and reviews on the site since its launch in 2008, with 100 million of those check-ins happening in 2011. During the 2013 Super Bowl, GetGlue had more than 200,000 check-ins and 400,000-plus total activities (likes, replies, votes, etc.). In addition, 15% of all Pepsi mentions on Twitter during the halftime show came from GetGlue. The 2013 Oscars saw 210,000 in total activity on GetGlue: 410,000 for Les Misérables, and 190,000 for Argo.

== Funding ==
From its initial round in 2007 to 2013, GetGlue raised a total of over $25 million in venture capital, from VC firms including Union Square Ventures (backer of Twitter, Foursquare and others), Rho Ventures, RRE Ventures, and Time Warner Investments.

== See also ==
- TV Time, a similar website and mobile application.
