= Tank Top TV =

Website providing film and TV programming

Tank Top TV was a website providing personalized programme listings and recommendations for online TV and movies in the United Kingdom.

Tank Top TV aggregated listings from BBC iPlayer, Channel 4, ITV Player and Demand Five. Users could personalize their listings by removing programmes or categories they are not interested in. It also provided personalized programme recommendations, using a proprietary algorithm based on collaborative filtering. The Tank Top Movies site listed films from UK on-demand services including LoveFilm, BlinkBox, Now TV and iTunes.

Tank Top TV won the Business category of the Enfield Innovation Awards 2012, the "Best Design" category at Hackfest TV in 2012, and was one of the 2013 cohort at the Wayra London startup accelerator. In 2014 Tank Top TV launched an API allowing developers to embed TV and movie search and recommendations into devices such as set-top boxes.

== See also ==
- Recommender system
- Video on demand
