= Network Computing =

Computer networking tech news

Network Computing is an online technical news publication that began as a printed magazine. During that period, Advertising Age ranked it among the Top 300 print magazines. and advanced in 1995 from #146 to #133 with a circulation of 38,500. It still has trade show affiliations.

== History ==
The print magazine's resources including six evaluation labs.

- May 1997 through 2000 – The worldwide regional publications of LAN Magazine were renamed to the already existing Network Magazine. Networkmagazine.com and lanmag.com now redirect to informationweek.com
- June 2004 - All security-related topics centralized within CMP under Network Computing umbrella.
- July 2004 - The print magazine was one of approximately 1,500 included on a US Postal Rate Commission survey regarding postal rates.
- September 2005 – Network Magazine (networkmagazine.com) was renamed IT Architect (itarchitect.com). The offline publication was shut down after the March 2006 issue. ITarchitect.com now redirects to InformationWeek.
- June 2006 – The company announced that offline publication of Network Computing would be merged with Information Week. Online, Network Computing (networkcomputing.com) would provide technical content, whereas informationweek.com would provide news. UBM renamed CMP Media to CMP Technology.
- 2008 – CMP Technology was restructured into four independent operating divisions under the common banner of UBM.
- 2009 - Network Computing given own (revived) online identity
- 2013 – Parent UMB announced that "print publications will end production as of July 1."
- 2018 - Network Computing owner UBM (since 2008) merged with London-based Informa.
- 2020 - web site cookie analytics for Network Computing to be handled by internal UBM unit named informationweekanalytics.com

== Affiliations ==
Although Network Computing has its own editorial/content unit

- Marketing/Advertising functions for Network Computing are handled by Informa's Informationweek unit.
- it also has an affiliated conference, Interop

=== Online ===
Their Twitter account began in December 2008. A 2009 headline in Advertising Age announced "TechWeb revives 'Network Computing' online."

== Awards ==
The magazine gives awards for companies, products and services in various categories.
