= Spain–United States relations =

- Spain: United States

Diplomatic mission
- Spanish Embassy, Washington, D.C.: Embassy of the United States, Madrid

Envoy
- Ambassador Ángeles Moreno Bau: Ambassador Benjamin Leon

The Kingdom of Spain and the United States of America maintain bilateral international relations. The Spaniards were the first Europeans to establish a permanent settlement in what is now United States territory. The first settlement in modern-day United States territory was San Juan, Puerto Rico, founded in 1521 by Spanish explorer Juan Ponce de León. 35 years later, Spanish admiral Pedro Menéndez de Avilés founded the city of St. Augustine, Spanish Florida (the earliest settlement in the continental United States), which became a small outpost that never grew very large. More permanent, much larger territories were established in New Mexico and California, with a few in Texas and Arizona, forming part of the colonial history of the United States. Although the Spanish elements in the history of the United States were mostly ignored by American historians in the decades after independence, the concept of the "Spanish borderlands" in the American Southwest was developed by American historians in the 20th century, which integrated Spain into U.S. history. Spain-US relations have been seen as one of "love and hate".

Spain provided indirect support to the new United States by fighting against Great Britain during the American Revolutionary War. Madrid tacitly recognised the independence of the United States in 1783. The purchase of the underdeveloped Spanish Florida by the US was made effective in 1821. The U.S. gave diplomatic support to the breakaway Spanish viceroyalties as they secured their independence around 1820. American diplomatic offers to buy Cuba in the 1850s failed. When Cuba revolted in the late 19th century American opinion became strongly hostile to Spanish rule over Cuba. The Spanish–American War erupted in 1898. The Spanish defeat in the conflict entailed the loss of the last Spanish overseas territories outside north Africa, notably Cuba, Puerto Rico, Guam and the Philippines.

When the Spanish Civil War erupted in 1936, Washington was neutral and banned arms sales to either side; oil sales were allowed. Congress endorsed the embargo by a near-unanimous vote. President Franklin Roosevelt quietly favored the left-wing Republican (or "Loyalist") government, but intense pressure by American Catholics forced him to maintain a policy of neutrality. Spain was carefully neutral in World War II, despite its ties with Nazi Germany.

As the Cold War deepened after 1950, Washington threw a lifeline to the Francoist dictatorship that included financial aid and military bases. Membership in NATO came in 1982, after Francisco Franco's death and the Spanish transition to democracy.

== 18th century ==
=== Spain and the American Revolution ===
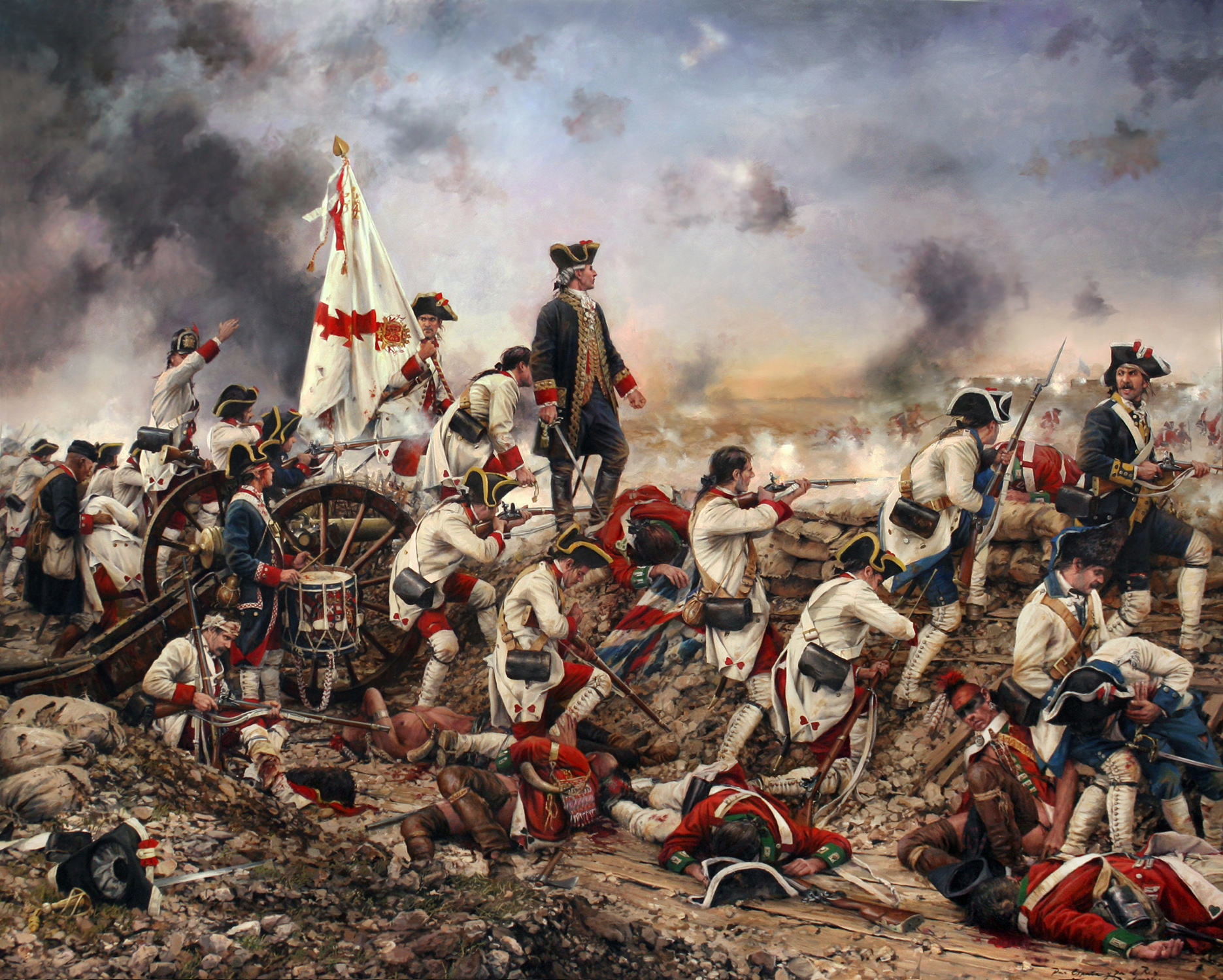
Painting of Gálvez at the Siege of Pensacola by Augusto Ferrer-Dalmau

Spain declared war on Great Britain as an ally of the Kingdom of France, and provided supplies and munitions to the Continental Army. However Spain was not an ally of the Patriots. It was reluctant to recognize the independence of the United States, because it distrusted revolutionaries. Historian Thomas A. Bailey says of Spain:

Although she was attracted by the prospect of a war [against Britain] for restitution and revenge, she was repelled by the specter of an independent and powerful American republic. Such a new state might reach over the Alleghenies into the Mississippi Valley and grasp territory that Spain wanted for herself.

Among the most notable Spaniards warriors was Bernardo de Gálvez y Madrid, Count of Gálvez, who defeated the British at Manchac, Baton Rouge, and Natchez in 1779, clearing the lower Mississippi Valley of British forces and relieved the threat to the capital of Spanish Louisiana, New Orleans. In 1780, he recaptured Mobile and in 1781 took by land and by sea Pensacola, leaving the British with no bases in the Gulf of Mexico. In recognition for his actions to the American cause, George Washington took him to his right in the parade of July 4 and the American Confederation Congress cited Gálvez for his aid during the Revolution.

Floridablanca instructed the Count of Aranda to sign a Treaty with the United States on March 17, 1783, thus making Spain tacitly recognise then the independence of the US.

Another notable contributor was Diego de Gardoqui, who was appointed as Spain's first minister to the United States of America in 1784. Gardoqui became well acquainted with Washington, and also marched in President Washington's inaugural parade. King Charles III of Spain continued communications with Washington, sending him gifts such as blooded livestock from Spain that Washington had requested for his farm at Mount Vernon.

=== Spain and the United States in the late 18th century ===
The United States' first ambassador to Spain was John Jay (but was not formally received at court). Jay's successor, William Carmichael, married a Spanish woman and is buried in the Catholic cemetery in Madrid. Some friendly ties were established: George Washington had established the American mule-raising industry with high-quality large donkeys sent to him by the King of Spain (as well as Lafayette).

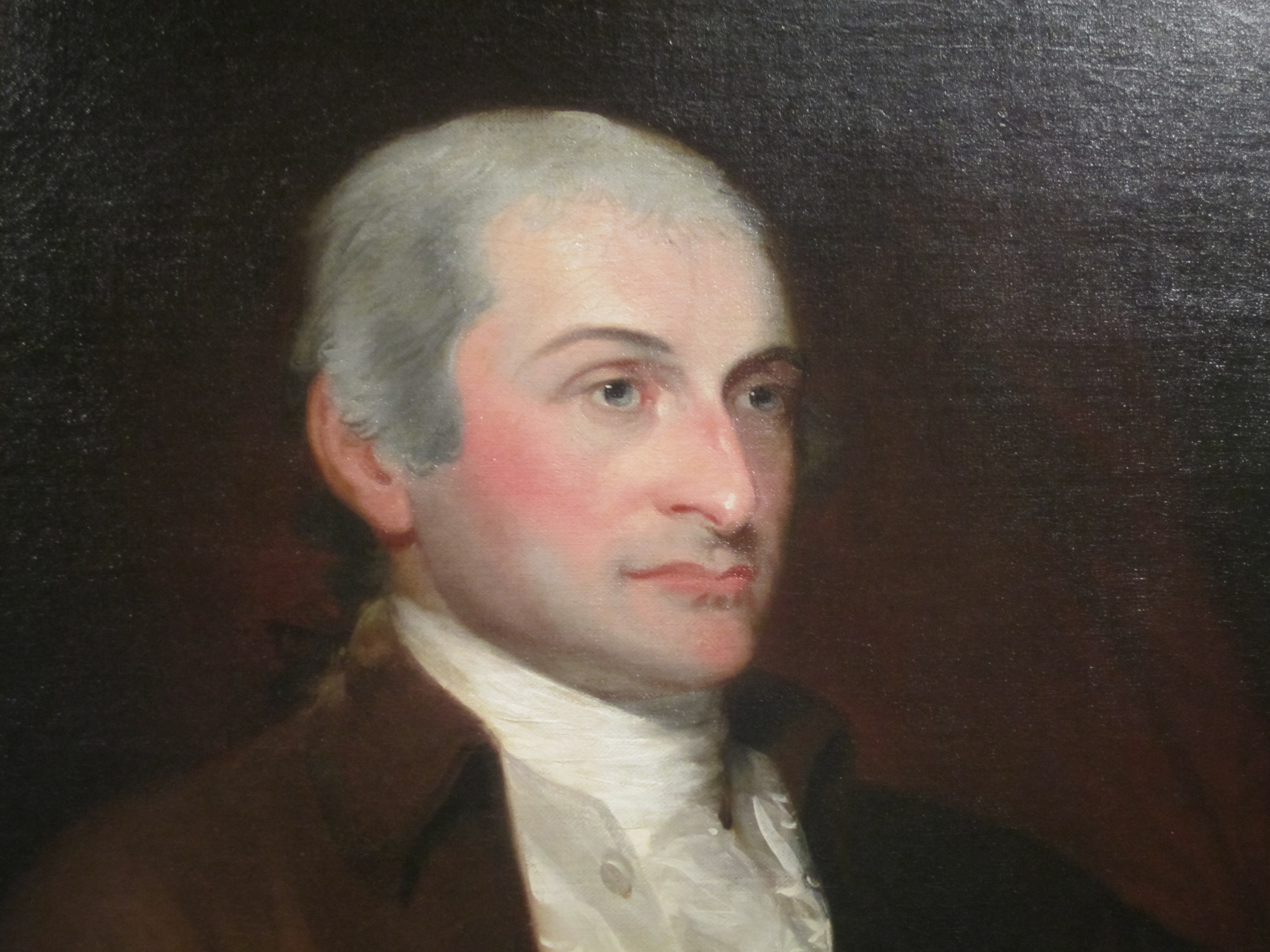
John Jay served as minister to Spain, and was Secretary of Foreign Affairs from 1784 to 1789

Spain fought the British as an ally of France during the Revolutionary War, but it distrusted republicanism and was not officially an ally of the United States. After the war, the main relationships dealt with trade, with access to the Mississippi River, and with Spanish maneuvers with Native Americans to block American expansion. Spain controlled the territories of Florida and Louisiana, positioned to the south and west of the United States. Americans had long recognized the importance of navigation rights on the Mississippi River, as it was the only realistic outlet for many settlers in the trans-Appalachian lands to ship their products to other markets, including the Eastern Seaboard of the United States.

Despite having fought a common enemy in the Revolutionary War, Spain saw U.S. expansionism as a threat to its empire. Seeking to stop the American settlement of the Old Southwest, Spain denied the U.S. navigation rights on the Mississippi River, provided arms to Native Americans, and recruited friendly American settlers to the sparsely populated territories of Florida and Louisiana. Additionally, Spain disputed the Southern and Western borders of the United States. The most important border dispute centered on the border between Georgia and West Florida, as Spain and the United States both claimed parts of present-day Alabama and Mississippi. Spain paid cash to American General James Wilkinson for a plot to make much of the region secede, but nothing came of it. Meanwhile, Spain worked on the goal of stopping American expansion by setting up an Indian buffer state in the South. They worked with Alexander McGillivray (1750–1793), who was born to a Scottish trader and his French-Indian wife, and he had become a leader of the Creek tribe as well as an agent for British merchants. In 1784–1785, treaties were signed with Creeks, the Chickasaws, and the Choctaws to make peace among themselves, and ally with Spain. While the Indian leaders were receptive, Yankee merchants were much better suppliers of necessities than Spain, and the pan-Indian coalition proved unstable.

Spanish merchants welcomed trade with the new nation, which had been impossible when it was a British colony. it therefore encourage the United States to set up consulates in Spain's New World colonies American merchants and Eastern cities likewise wanted to open trade with the Spanish colonies which had been forbidden before 1775. A new line of commerce involved American merchants importing goods from Britain, and then reselling them to the Spanish colonies.

John Jay negotiated a treaty with Spain to resolve these disputes and expand commerce. Spain also tried direct diplomacy offering access to the Spanish market, but the cost of closing the Mississippi to Western farmers for 25 years and blocking southern expansionists. The resulting Jay–Gardoqui Treaty was rejected by a coalition of Southerners led by James Madison and James Monroe of Virginia, who complained that it would hurt their people and instead favored Northeastern commercial interests. The treaty was defeated.

Pinckney's Treaty, also known as the Treaty of San Lorenzo or the Treaty of Madrid, was signed in San Lorenzo de El Escorial on October 27, 1795, and established intentions of friendship between the United States and Spain. It also defined the boundaries of the United States with the Spanish colonies and guaranteed the United States navigation rights on the Mississippi River. Both sides remained distrustful. Secretary of State Timothy Pickering feared that Spain might turn over Louisiana to her much more powerful associate France. Spain, by early 1797, was stalling the fulfillment of the 1795 treaty. Finally in 1798 Madrid backed down and relations improved.

== 19th century ==
=== Early 19th century ===
Spanish–American relations declined during the 19th century, as both countries competed for territory and concessions in the New World. "Culturally, they misunderstood and distrusted each other", James W. Cortada has written. "Political conflicts and cultural differences colored relations between the two nations throughout the nineteenth century, creating a tradition of conflict of a generally unfriendly nature. By 1855, a heritage of problems, hostile images, and suspicions existed which profoundly influenced their relations."

During the Peninsular War, when Spain had two rival Kings – the overthrown Bourbon Fernando VII and Napoleon's brother, Joseph Bonaparte, enthroned as José I of Spain – the United States officially maintained a neutral position between them. Ambassador Luis de Onís who arrived in New York in 1809, representing Fernando VII's government, was refused an audience to present his credentials to President James Madison. He was only recognized officially by the US government in 1815, following Napoleon's defeat – though in the meantime he had established himself in Philadelphia and unofficially conducted extensive diplomatic activity.

The two countries found themselves on opposite sides during the War of 1812. By 1812 the continued existence of Spanish colonies east of the Mississippi River caused resentment in the United States. Escaped slaves went there and armed themselves. Spain stopped returning escapees in 1794. With clandestine support from Washington, American settlers in the Floridas revolted against Spanish rule and Spain lost West Florida. Between 1806 and 1821, the area known as the "Sabine Free State" was an area between Spanish Texas and the U.S. Louisiana Territory that both sides agreed to maintain as neutral due to disputes over the area.

The Adams–Onís Treaty between the two countries was signed in 1819. The treaty was the result of increasing tensions between the U.S. and Spain regarding territorial rights at a time of weakened Spanish power in the New World. In addition to granting Florida to the United States, the treaty settled a boundary dispute along the Sabine River in Texas and firmly established the boundary of U.S. territory and claims through the Rocky Mountains and west to the Pacific Ocean in exchange for the U.S. paying residents' claims against the Spanish government up to a total of $5,000,000 and relinquishing its own claims on parts of Texas west of the Sabine River and other Spanish areas.

By the mid-1820s, Spaniards believed that the United States wanted to control the entire New World at Spain's expense, considering the independence movements in Latin America as proof of this. In 1821, a Spaniard wrote that Americans "consider themselves superior to all the nations of Europe." In the United States, Spain was viewed as permanently condemned by the Black Legend, and as a backward, crude, and despotic country that opposed the Monroe Doctrine and Manifest destiny. Nevertheless, travel literature on Spain sold well in the US, and the writings of Washington Irving, who had served as U.S. Minister to Spain, generated some friendly spirit in the United States towards Spain.

=== Mid-19th century ===
Tensions continued throughout the 19th century. Queen Isabella II, who reigned from 1833 to 1868, became a dominant figure in Spanish-American relations. In 1839 she became involved in the Amistad affair, over the fate of the schooner La Amistad and the 53 slaves she carried. Isabella was one of several claimants to their ownership, and even after its resolution in 1841, following a U.S. Supreme Court decision, the Spanish government continued to press for compensation. She involved her country in the Chincha Islands War (1864–1866), which pitted Spain against her former possessions of Peru and Chile. The American Minister to Chile, Hugh Judson Kilpatrick, was involved in an attempt to arbitrate between the combatants of the Chincha Islands War. The attempt failed, and Kilpatrick asked the American naval commander Commander Rodgers to defend the port and attack the Spanish fleet. Admiral Casto Méndez Núñez famously responded with, "I will be forced to sink [the US ships], because even if I have one ship left I will proceed with the bombardment. Spain, the Queen and I prefer honor without ships than ships without honor." ("España prefiere honra sin barcos a barcos sin honra".) During the Chincha Islands War, Spanish Admiral Pareja imposed a blockade of Chile's main ports. The blockade of the port of Valparaíso, however, caused such great economic damage to Chilean and foreign interests, that the British and American governments lodged a formal protest.

During the mid-nineteenth century, one American diplomat declared:

You must treat Spain as you would a pretty woman with a bad temper. Firm and constant and unyielding in your purpose, but flexible and always flattering in form – watching her moods – taking advantages of her prejudices and passions to modify her conduct towards you... logic and sound policy will not guide her unless you take good care of the region of her sentiments first.

— Horatio J. Perry

The romantic historian Washington Irving (1783–1859) was appointed minister by President John Tyler in 1842–1846. The history, customs, and pageantry of Spain seduced Irving. He admired the de facto head of state, regent Baldomero Espartero, then locked in a power struggle with the Spanish Cortes. Irving's official reports on the ensuing civil war and revolution expressed his romantic fascination with the regent as young Queen Isabella's knight protector, He wrote with an anti-republican, undiplomatic bias. Though Espartero, ousted in July 1843, remained a fallen hero in his eyes, Irving began to view Spanish affairs more realistically.

==== Cuba ====
But it was the issue of Cuba that dominated relations between Spain and the United States during this period. At the same time that the United States wished to expand its trade and investments in Cuba during this period, Spanish officials enforced a series of commercial regulations designed to discourage trade relations between Cuba and the U.S. Spain believed that American economic encroachment would result in physical annexation of the island; the kingdom fashioned its colonial policies accordingly.

In a letter to Hugh Nelson, U.S. Minister to Spain, Secretary of State John Quincy Adams described the likelihood of U.S. "annexation of Cuba" within half a century despite obstacles: "But there are laws of political as well as of physical gravitation; and if an apple severed by the tempest from its native tree cannot choose but fall to the ground, Cuba, forcibly disjoined from its own unnatural connection with Spain, and incapable of self support, can gravitate only towards the North American Union, which by the same law of nature cannot cast her off from its bosom."

In 1850, John A. Quitman, Governor of Mississippi, was approached by the filibuster Narciso López to lead his filibuster expedition of 1850 to Cuba. Quitman turned down the offer because of his desire to serve out his term as governor, but did offer assistance to López in obtaining men and material for the expedition.

In 1854 a secret proposal known as the Ostend Manifesto was devised by American diplomats to purchase Cuba from Spain for $130 million, thereby opening new slave territory. The manifesto was rejected due to vehement objections from abolitionist activists when the plans became public. When President James Buchanan addressed Congress on December 6, 1858, he listed several complaints against Spain, which included the treatment of Americans in Cuba, lack of direct diplomatic communication with the captain general of Cuba, maritime incidents, and commercial barriers to the Cuban market. "The truth is that Cuba", Buchanan stated, "in its existing colonial condition, is a constant source of injury and annoyance to the American people." Buchanan went on to hint that the US may be forced to purchase Cuba and stated that Cuba's value to Spain "is comparatively unimportant." The speech shocked Spanish officials.

==== Santo Domingo ====
Another source of conflict and rivalry was the Captaincy General of Santo Domingo, recreated when Spain annexed the independent Dominican Republic at the request of President Pedro Santana in 1861. The U.S. and Spain had competed with one another for influence in Hispaniola in the 1850s and 1860s; the U.S. was worried about a possible military expansion by Spain in the Caribbean and the Gulf of Mexico (which would make it harder to acquire Cuba).

=== Spain and the American Civil War and after ===
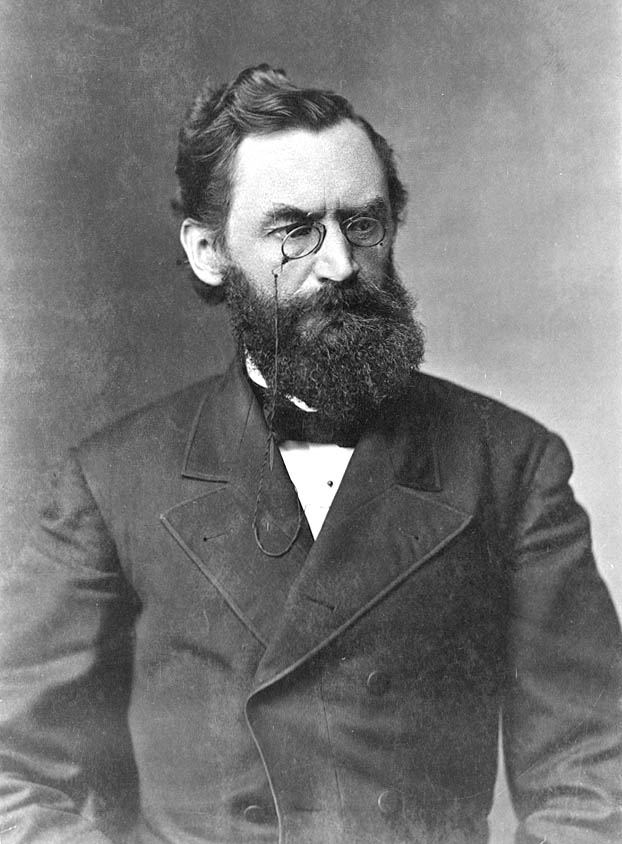
Carl Schurz, Minister to Spain during the U.S. Civil War

At the outbreak of the American Civil War, the Union was concerned about possible European aid to the Confederacy as well as official diplomatic recognition of the breakaway republic. In response to possible intervention from Spain, President Abraham Lincoln sent Carl Schurz, who he felt was able and energetic, as minister to Spain. Schurz's chief duty was to block Spanish recognition of, and aid to, the Confederacy. Part of the Union strategy in Spain was to remind the Spanish court that it had been Southerners, now Confederates, who had pressed for annexation of Cuba. Schurz was successful in his efforts; Spain officially declared neutrality on June 17, 1861. However, since neither the Union nor the Confederacy would sign a formal treaty guaranteeing that Cuba would never be threatened, Madrid remained convinced that American imperialism would resume as soon as the Civil War had ended.

Horatio Perry was Secretary of the U.S. Legation in Madrid. His Spanish wife, Carolina Coronado (1820–1911), one of the most well-known poets writing in mid-19th-century Spain, played a role. She both negotiated with the Spanish royal family in private and, through a series of widely published poems, promoted the aims of the Lincoln administration, especially abolition. At a time when women were not invited to public political conversations, Coronado succeeded in persuasively arguing against Spain's imperial legacy and urging support to rectify her nation's past colonial blunders, especially the introduction of slavery to the Americas.

A major revolt broke out in Cuba, the Ten Years' War (1868–1878). President Ulysses S. Grant took a keen interest; he clearly favored independence from Spain. He proposed American meditation, but Spain refused and the revolt slowly petered out. Grant's Secretary of State Hamilton Fish had a more balanced approach. Fish also resolved the Virginius Affair of 1873–1875.

=== Spanish–American War ===
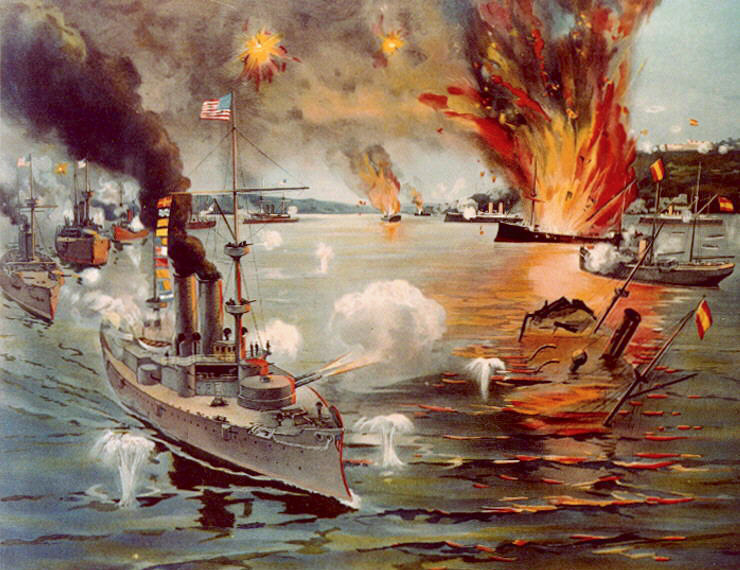
The Battle of Manila Bay, 1898

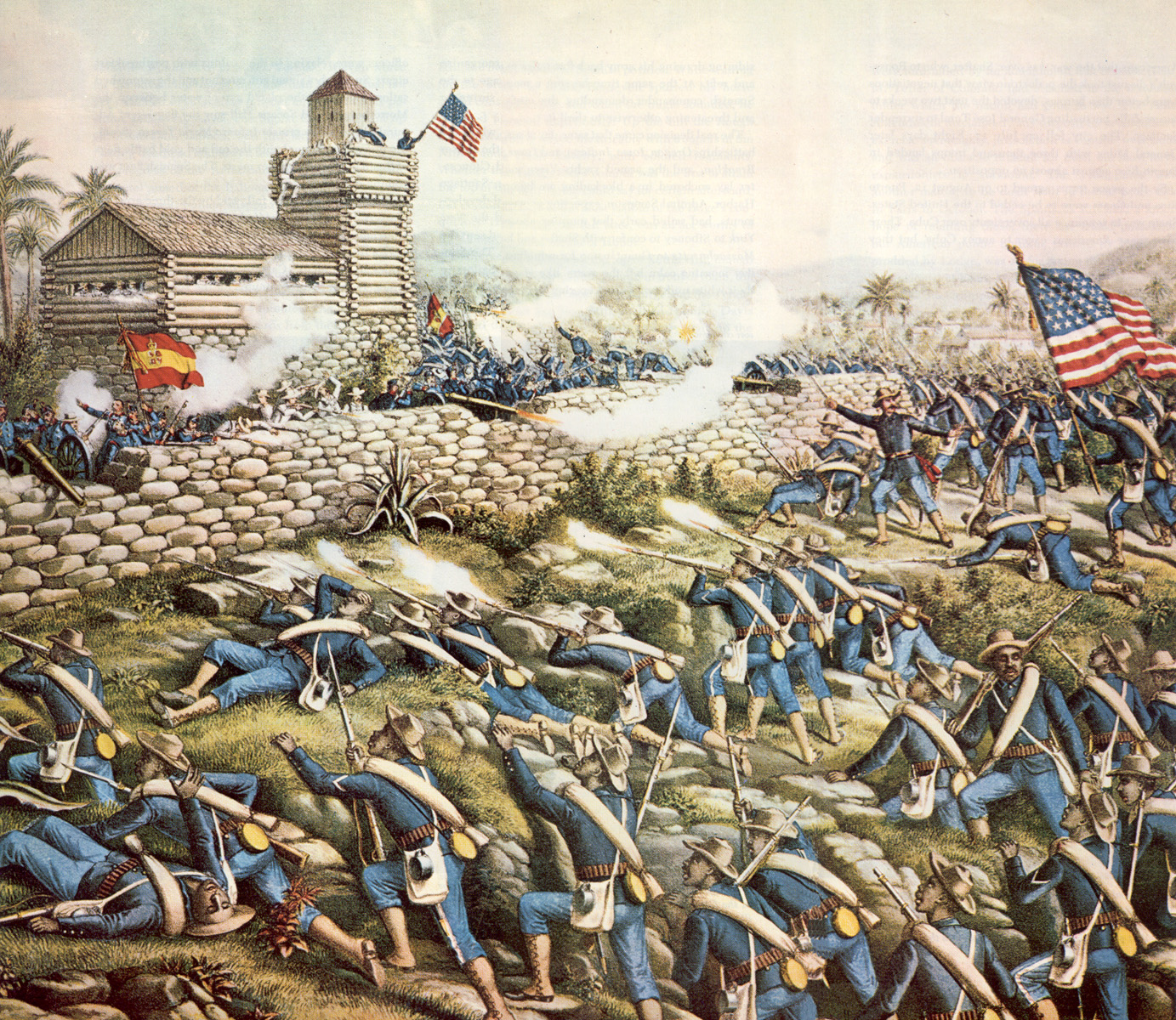
Detail from Charge of the 24th and 25th Colored Infantry and Rescue of Rough Riders at San Juan Hill, July 2, 1898 depicting the Battle of San Juan Hill.

The Spanish–American War began in April 1898. Hostilities halted in August of that year, and the Treaty of Paris was signed in December.

American diplomats were responsive to the business community's demands for overseas expansion. Minister Hannis Taylor (1893–97) tried to support American business regarding Cuba. He was largely ignored, and he blamed Madrid's ineptitude. In June 1897, President William McKinley appointed Stewart L. Woodford to the post of Envoy Extraordinary and Minister Plenipotentiary to Spain, in a last attempt to convince the Spanish government to sell its colonies. Spain refused and severed diplomatic relations with the U.S. on April 21, 1898.

The War was the first conflict in which military action was precipitated by media involvement. The war grew out of U.S. interest in a fight for revolution between the Spanish military and citizens of their Cuban colony. American yellow press fanned the flames of interest in the war by fabricating atrocities during the Cuban War of Independence, to justify intervention in a number of Spanish colonies worldwide, like Puerto Rico, the Philippines, Guam and the Caroline Islands.

Many stories were either elaborated, misrepresented or completely fabricated by journalists to enhance their dramatic effect. Theodore Roosevelt, who was the Assistant Secretary of the Navy at this time, wanted to use the conflict both to help heal the wounds still fresh from the American Civil War, and to increase the strength of the US Navy, while simultaneously establishing America as a presence on the world stage. Roosevelt put pressure on the United States Congress to come to the aid of the Cuban people. He emphasized Cuban weakness and femininity to justify America's military intervention.

Riots in Havana by pro-Spanish "Voluntarios" gave the United States the perfect excuse to send in the warship USS Maine. After the unexplained explosion of the Maine, tension among the American people was raised by the anti-Spanish campaign that accused Spain of extensive atrocities, agitating American public opinion.

The war ended after decisive naval victories for the United States in the Philippines and Cuba, only 109 days after the outbreak of war. The Treaty of Paris, which ended the conflict, gave the United States ownership of the former Spanish colonies of Puerto Rico, the Philippines and Guam.

Spain had appealed to the common heritage shared by her and the Cubans. On March 5, 1898, Ramón Blanco y Erenas, Spanish governor of Cuba, proposed to Máximo Gómez that the Cuban generalissimo and troops join him and the Spanish army in repelling the United States in the face of the Spanish–American War. Blanco appealed to the shared heritage of the Cubans and Spanish, and promised the island autonomy if the Cubans would help fight the Americans. Blanco had declared: "As Spaniards and Cubans we find ourselves opposed to foreigners of a different race, who are of a grasping nature. ... The supreme moment has come in which we should forget past differences and, with Spaniards and Cubans united for the sake of their own defense, repel the invader. Spain will not forget the noble help of its Cuban sons, and once the foreign enemy is expelled from the island, she will, like an affectionate mother, embrace in her arms a new daughter amongst the nations of the New World, who speaks the same language, practices the same faith, and feels the same noble Spanish blood run through her veins." Gómez refused to adhere to Blanco's plan.

In Spain, a new cultural wave called the Generation of '98 responded to the deep trauma caused by this disastrous war, marking a renaissance of culture in Spain.

In spite of having been proven false, many of the lies and negative connotations against Spain and the Spanish people, product of the American propaganda of the Spanish–American War, lingered for a long time after the end of the war itself, and contributed largely to a new recreation of the myth of the Black Legend against Spain.

The war also left a residue of anti-American sentiment in Spain, whose citizens felt a sense of betrayal by the very country they had helped to obtain their independence. Many historians and journalists pointed out also the needless nature of this war, because up to that time, relations between Spain and the United States had always enjoyed very amiable conditions, with both countries resolving their differences with mutual agreements that benefited both sides, such as with the sale of Florida by terms of the Treaty of Amity.

== 20th century ==
Nonetheless, in the post-war period, Spain enhanced its trading position by developing closer commercial ties with the United States. The two countries signed a series of trade agreements in 1902, 1906, and 1910. These trade agreements led to an increased exchange of manufactured goods and agricultural products. American tourists began to come to Spain during this time.

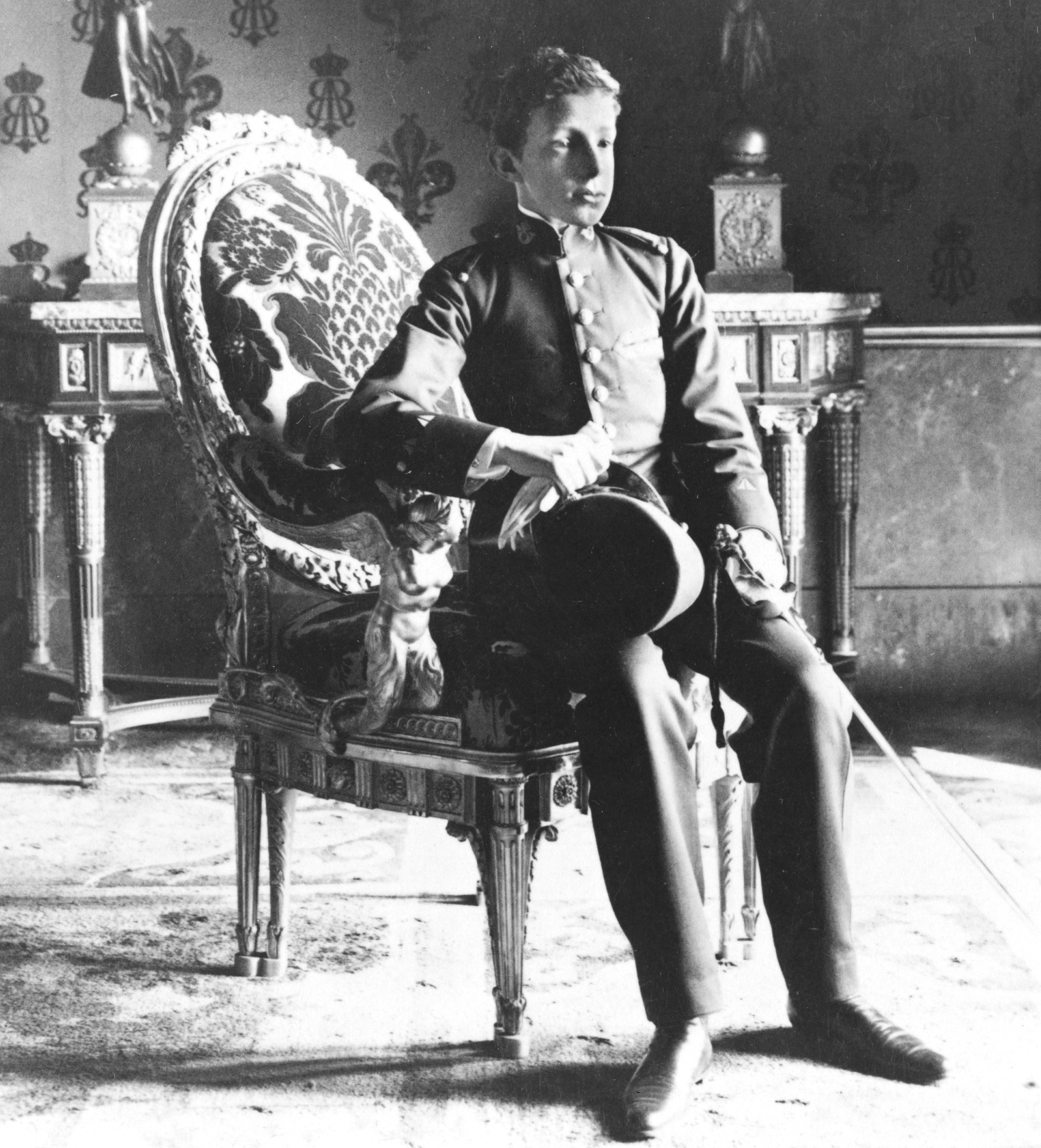
Alfonso XIII of Spain, 1901

Spain, under Alfonso XIII, remained neutral during the First World War, and the war greatly benefited Spanish industry and exports. At the same time, Spain did intern a small German force in Spanish Guinea in November 1915 and also worked to ease the suffering of prisoners of war. Spain was a founding member of the League of Nations in 1920 (but withdrew in May 1939).

The two countries were engaged in a tariff war after the Fordney–McCumber Tariff was passed in 1922 by the United States; Spain raised tariffs on American goods by 40%. In 1921, a "Student on tariffs" had warned against the Fordney Bill, declaring in The New York Times that "it should be remembered that the Spanish are a conservative people. They are wedded to their ways and much inertia must be overcome before they will adopt machinery and devices such as are largely exported from the United States. If the price of modern machinery, not manufactured in Spain, is increased exorbitantly by high customs duties, the tendency of the Spanish will be simply to do without it, and it must not be imagined that they will purchase it anyhow because it has to be had from somewhere."

In 1928, Calvin Coolidge greeted King Alfonso on the telephone; it was the first use by the president of a new transatlantic telephone line with Spain.

Culturally, during the 1920s, Spanish feelings towards the United States remained ambivalent. A New York Times article dated June 3, 1921, called "How Spain Views U.S.", quoted a Spanish newspaper (El Sol) as declaring that the "United States is a young, formidable and healthy nation." The article in El Sol also expressed the opinion that "the United States is a nation of realities, declaring that Spain in its foreign policy does not possess that quality." The Spanish newspaper, in discussing the relations between Spain and the U.S., also argued "that the problem of acquiring a predominant position in the South American republics should be vigorously studied by Spain."

In 1921, Luis Araquistáin wrote a book called El Peligro Yanqui ("The Yankee Peril"), in which he condemned American nationalism, mechanization, anti-socialism ("socialism is a social heresy there") and architecture, finding particular fault with the country's skyscrapers, which he felt diminished individuality and increased anonymity. He called the United States "a colossal child: all appetite ..." Nevertheless, America exercised an obvious fascination on Spanish writers during the 1920s. While in the United States, Federico García Lorca had stayed, among other places, in New York City, where he studied briefly at Columbia University School of General Studies. His collection of poems Poeta en Nueva York explores his alienation and isolation through some graphically experimental poetic techniques. Coney Island horrified and fascinated Lorca at the same time. "The disgust and anatagonism it aroused in him", writes C. Brian Morris, "suffuse two lines which he expunged from his first draft of 'Oda a Walt Whitman': "Brooklyn filled with daggers / and Coney Island with phalli."

=== Spanish Civil War 1936–1939 ===
President Franklin D. Roosevelt named his favorite historian Claude Bowers (1878–1958) as ambassador to Spain from 1933 to 1939. Bowers prophesied that Washington's unwillingness to take action during the Spanish Civil War would make wider war inevitable. His influence was minimal in Washington.

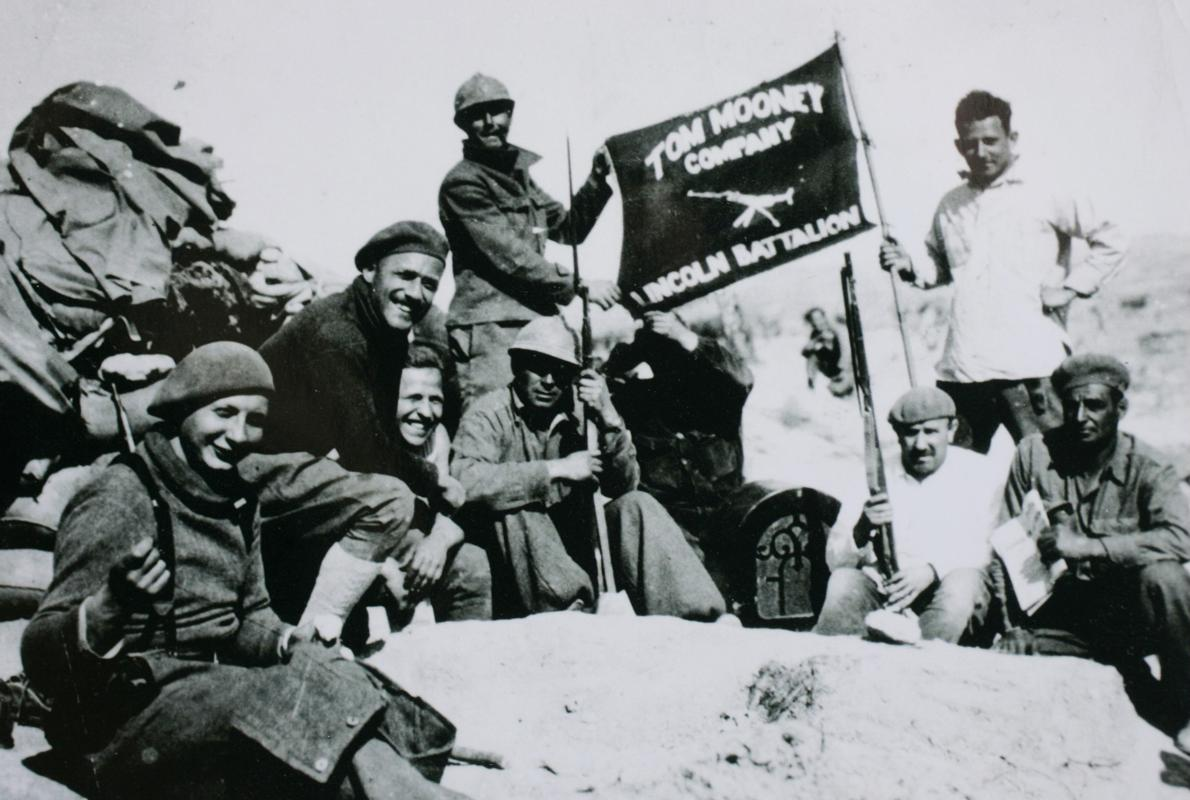
Members of the Abraham Lincoln Battalion's Tom Mooney Company in 1937.

When the Spanish Civil War erupted in 1936, the United States remained neutral and banned arms sales to either side. This was in line with both American neutrality policies, and with a Europe-wide agreement to not sell arms for use in the Spanish war lest it escalate into a world war. Congress endorsed the embargo by a near-unanimous vote. Only armaments were embargoed; American companies could sell oil and supplies to both sides. Roosevelt quietly favored the left-wing Republican (or "Loyalist") government, but intense pressure by American Catholics forced him to maintain a policy of neutrality. The Catholics insisted that lifting the embargo in favor of the Republican government "could only be the act of a hypocrite or a sucker" because, according to them, priests and nuns weren't given proper burials and were immolated by the anarchist elements of the Loyalist coalition. This successful pressure on Roosevelt was one of the handful of foreign policy successes notched by Catholic pressures on the White House in the 20th century. Nazi Germany and Fascist Italy provided munitions, and air support, and troops to the Nationalists, led by Francisco Franco. The Soviet Union provided aid to the Loyalist government, and mobilized thousands of volunteers to fight, including several hundred Americans in the Abraham Lincoln Battalion. All along the Spanish military forces supported the nationalists, and they steadily pushed the government forces back. By 1938, however, Roosevelt was planning to secretly send American warplanes through France to the desperate Loyalists. His senior diplomats warned that this would worsen the European crisis, so Roosevelt desisted.

The Nationalists, led by Francisco Franco, received important support from some elements of American business. The American-owned Vacuum Oil Company in Tangier, for example, refused to sell to Republican ships and at the outbreak of the war, the Texas Oil Company rerouted oil tankers headed for the Republic to the Nationalist-controlled port of Tenerife, and supplied tons of gasoline on credit to Franco until the war's end. American automakers Ford, Studebaker, and General Motors provided a total of 12,000 trucks to the Nationalists. After the war was over, José María Doussinague, who was at the time undersecretary at the Spanish Foreign Ministry, said, "without American petroleum and American trucks, and American credit, we could never have won the Civil War."

The Communist Party USA energetically recruited soldiers to fight against Franco in the Lincoln Battalion. In addition American anarchists sent the Sacco and Vanzetti Century of the Durruti Column. American poets like Alvah Bessie, William Lindsay Gresham, James Neugass, and Edwin Rolfe were members of the International Brigades. Wallace Stevens, Langston Hughes, Edna St. Vincent Millay, Randall Jarrell, and Philip Levine also wrote poetic responses to the Spanish Civil War. Kenneth Porter's poetry speaks of America's "insulation by ocean and 2,000 miles of complacency", and describes the American "men from the wheatfields / Spain was a furious sun which drew them along paths of light."

=== World War II ===
Francoist Spain sympathized with the Axis powers during World War II. While officially neutral, General Franco's government sold considerable material, especially tungsten, to both sides, including Germany. Thousands volunteered in the Blue Division, which fought for the Axis. As Germany weakened, Spain cut back its sales. Ambassador Alexander W. Weddell (1939–1942) managed to resolve a dispute over the National Telephone Company, the American owned (ITT) company that ran Spain's telephone system. He and Foreign Minister Ramón Serrano Suñer deeply disliked each other. Much more successful was historian Carlton J. H. Hayes who served as ambassador from 1942 to 1945. He was attacked at the time from the left for being overly friendly with Franco, but it has been generally held that he played a vital role in preventing Franco from siding with the Axis powers during the war. Historian Andrew N. Buchanan argues that Hayes made Spain into "Washington's 'silent ally.'"

John P. Willson argues that Hayes organized and expedited relief efforts for Jewish refugees moving through Spain. The U.S. War Refugee Board advocated a more dynamic policy of rescue rather than mere relief. The Board's hopes were frustrated more by Spanish reluctance than by Hayes'. Historian Emmet Kennedy rejects allegations that Hayes was an admirer of Franco. Instead he was "a tough critic of the caudillo's 'fascism'". Hayes played a central role in rescuing 40,000 refugees – French, British, Jews and others from Hitler. He helped them cross the Pyrenees into Spain and onward to North Africa. He made Spain "a haven from Hitler." In retirement, Kennedy finds, Hayes advocated patient diplomacy, rather than ostracism or subversion of Franco's Spain; this was the policy adopted by President Dwight D. Eisenhower as Franco led Spain into an alliance with the United States in the 1950s. The American Jewish Joint Distribution Committee operated openly in Barcelona.

=== Franco and the Cold War ===
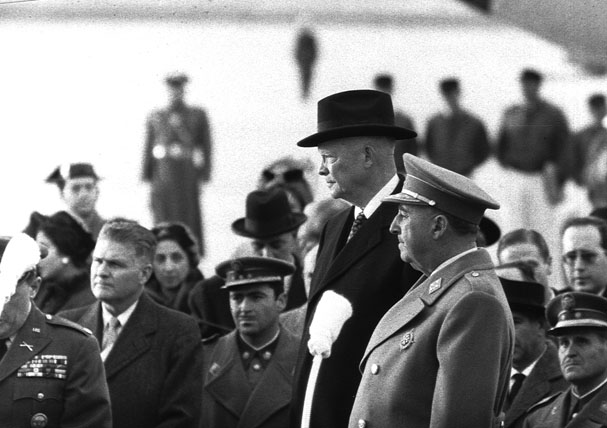
Francisco Franco and United States President Dwight D. Eisenhower in Madrid in 1959

With the end of World War II, Spain suffered from the economic consequences of its isolation from the international community. Spain was blocked from joining the United Nations, primarily by the large Communist element in France. By contrast the American officials in 1946 "praised the favorable 'transformation' that was occurring in US–Spanish relations." United States needed Spain as a strategically located ally in the Cold War against the Soviet Union after 1947. Unlike the case of other European countries (where the United States' image was identified with a "liberating" function in World War II and a role as "generous" investors in the Marshall Plan) and not unlike the case of some Latin American countries, the image of the United States in Spain was thus constructed by and large upon the American cooperation with the Francoist dictatorship.

President Harry S. Truman was a very strong opponent of Franco, calling him an evil anti-Protestant dictator comparable to Hitler, Mussolini, and Hirohito. Truman withdrew the American ambassador (but diplomatic relations were not formally broken), kept Spain out of the UN, and rejected any Marshall Aid to Spain. However, as the Cold War escalated, support for Spain sharply increased in the Pentagon, Congress, the business community and other influential elements especially Catholics and cotton growers. Liberal opposition to Spain faded after the left-wing Henry A. Wallace element broke with the Democratic Party in the 1948 presidential election; the Congress of Industrial Organizations dropped its strong opposition and became passive on the issue. As Secretary of State Dean Acheson increased his pressure on Truman, the president, stood alone in his administration as his own top appointees wanted to normalize relations. When China entered the Korean War and pushed American forces back, the argument for allies became irresistible. Admitting that he was "overruled and worn down," Truman relented and sent an ambassador and made loans available in late 1950.

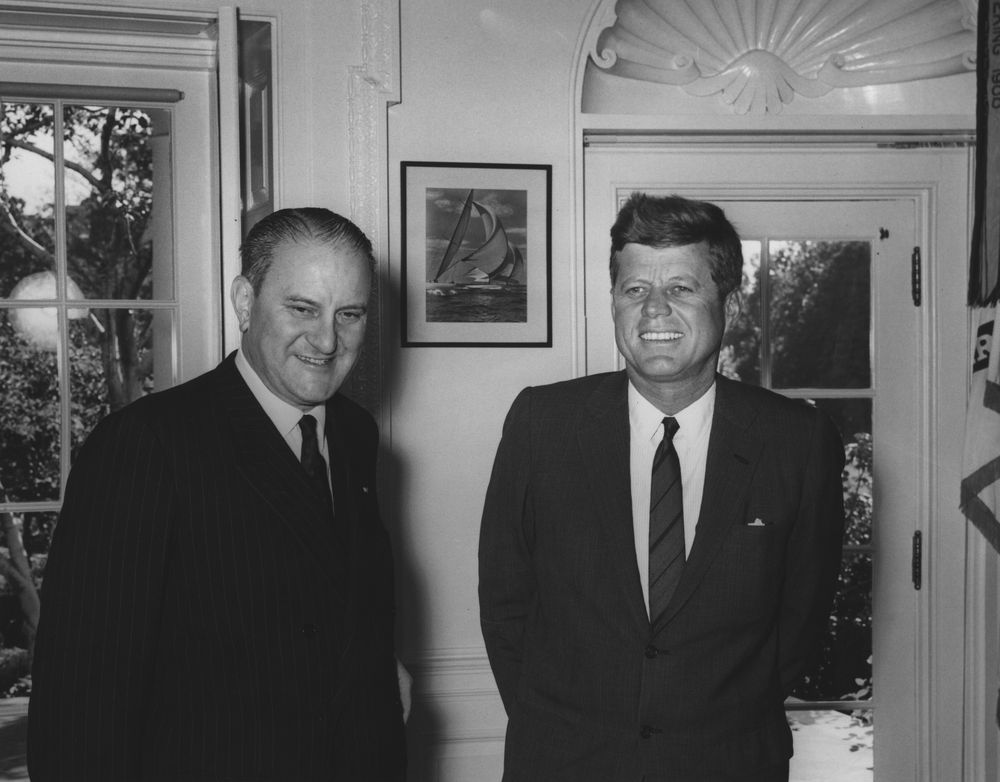
John Fitzgerald Kennedy receiving Fernando María Castiella at the White House in October 1963.

Trade relations improved. Exports to Spain rose from $43 million in 1946 to $57 million in 1952; imports to the US rose from $48 million to $63 million. A formal alliance commenced with the signing of the Pact of Madrid in 1953. Spain was then admitted to the United Nations in 1955. American poet James Wright wrote of Eisenhower's visit: "Franco stands in a shining circle of police. / His arms open in welcome. / He promises all dark things will be hunted down."

In the context of the Arab–Israeli conflict, Spain played the role of mediator between the Arab countries (such as the Nasser's United Arab Republic) and the United States. The Spanish diplomacy, led by Fernando María Castiella, showed disregard for what Spain regarded as the unconditional US support to the State of Israel and for the American attempt to sow discord among the Arab nations.

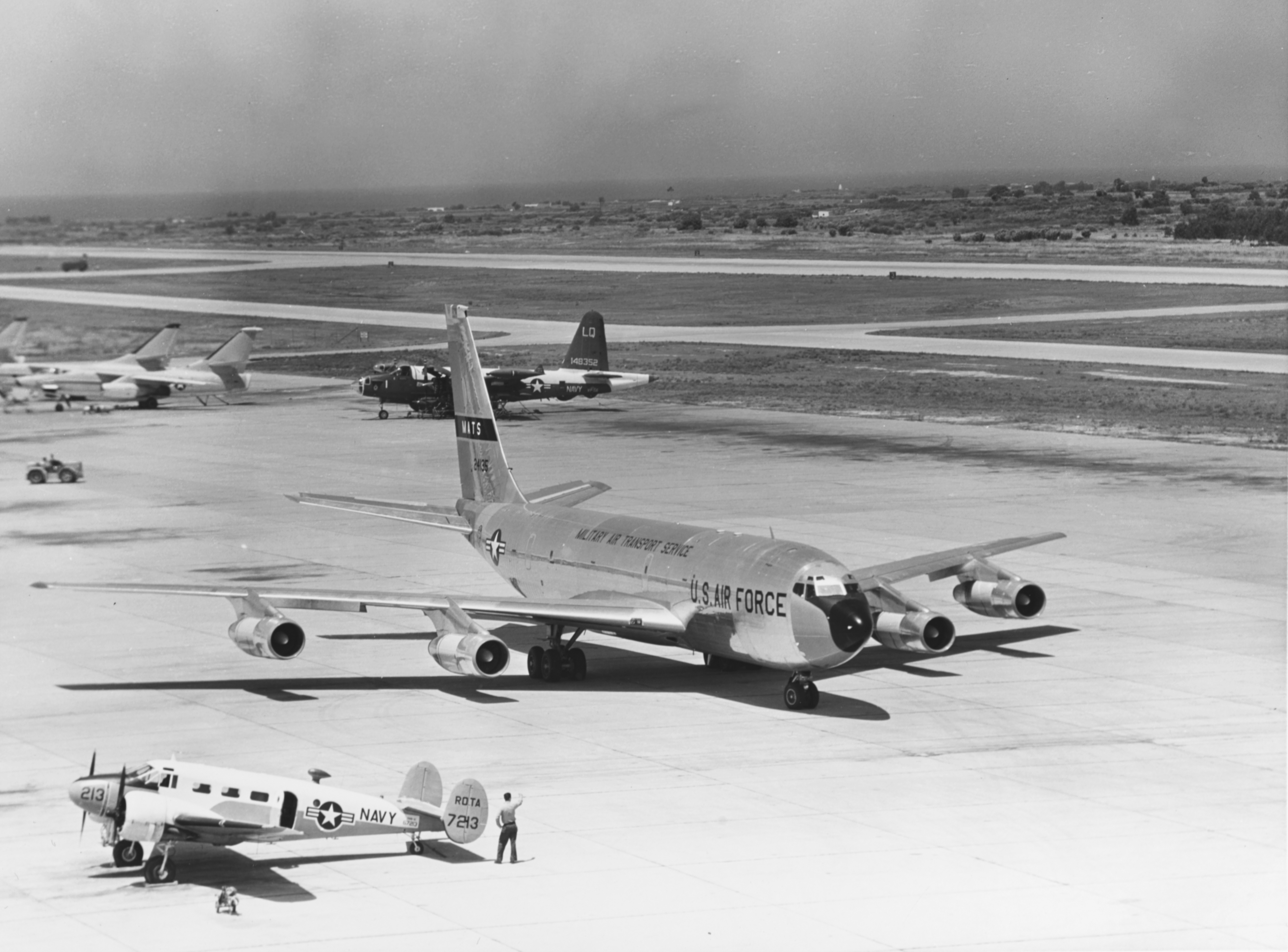
USAF aircraft in Naval Station Rota in the 1960s

Between 1969 and 1977, the period comprising the mandates of Henry Kissinger as National Security advisor and as Secretary of State of the US during the Nixon and Ford administrations, the US foreign policy towards Spain was driven by the American need to guarantee access to the military bases on Spanish soil. Military facilities of the United States in Spain built during the Franco era include Naval Station Rota and Morón Air Base, and an important facility existed at Torrejón de Ardoz. Torrejón passed under Spanish control in 1988; Rota has been in use since the 1950s. Crucial to Cold War strategy, the base did have nuclear weapons stationed on it for some time, and at its peak size in the early 1980s was home to 16,000 sailors and their families. The presence of these bases in Spain was very unpopular among the Spanish people (according to a 1976 poll by Louis Harris International, only 1 out of 10 Spaniards supported the American presence in the country); there were occasional protests against them, including a demonstration during President Ronald Reagan's 1985 visit to Spain.

During the Francoist dictatorship and later transition, Kissinger, related to the realist school, would support the notion of an orderly regime change for Spain, thus preserving access to the military bases as well as facilitating the full incorporation of Spain to the Western sphere, depending on Juan Carlos I.

President Richard Nixon toasted Franco and after Franco's death in 1975, stated that "General Franco was a loyal friend and ally of the United States."

=== Spanish Transition and shared NATO membership ===
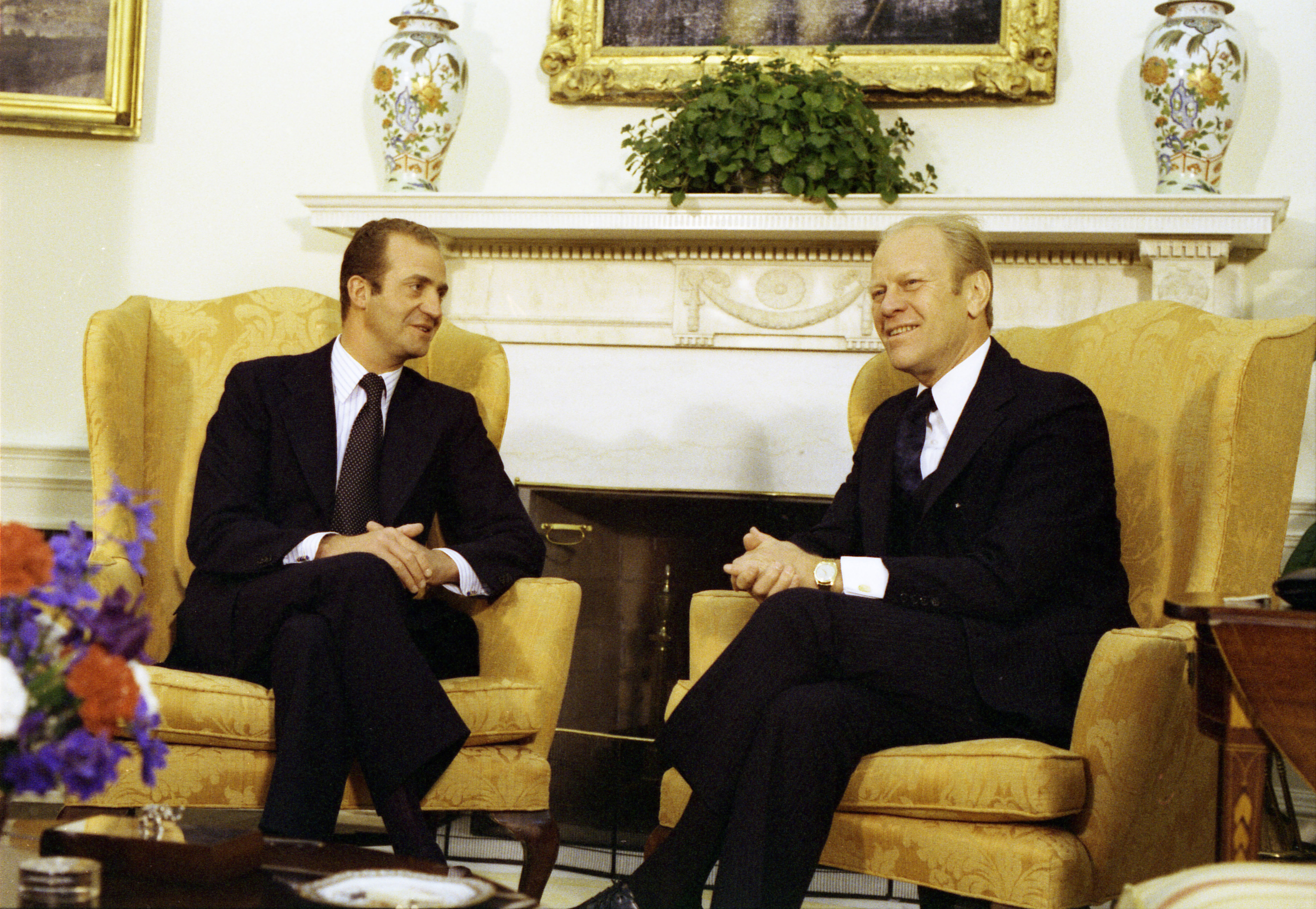
Gerald R. Ford and Juan Carlos I meeting in the Oval Office in 1976

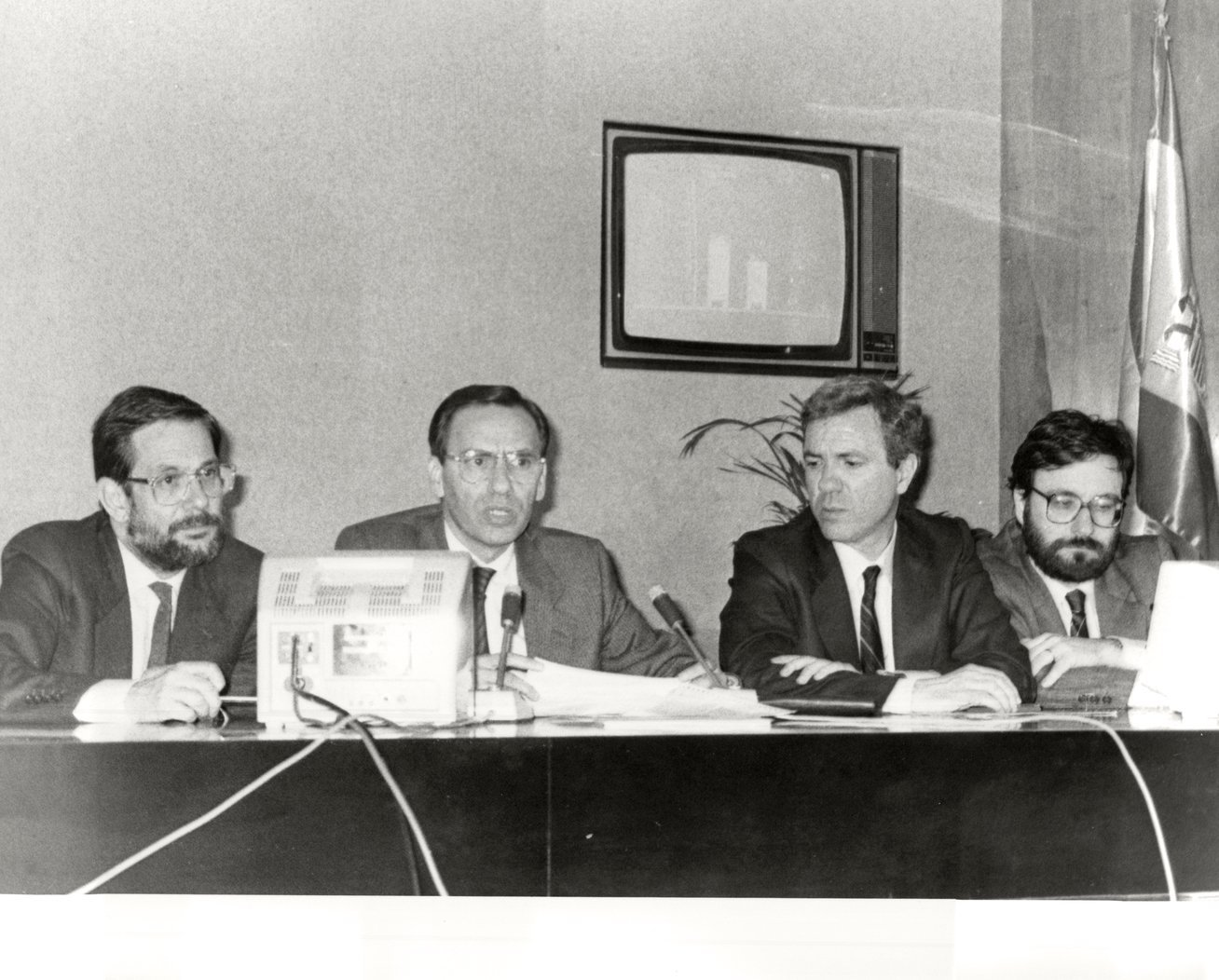
Government Vice President Alfonso Guerra (second from left) appears at a press conference to announce the results of the NATO referendum

In 1976, Spain and the United States signed a Treaty of Friendship and Cooperation (Tratado de Amistad y Cooperación), coinciding with the new political system in Spain, which became a constitutional monarchy under Juan Carlos I, with Carlos Arias Navarro as prime minister. Juan Carlos had already established friendly ties with the United States. As prince, he had been a guest of Nixon on January 26, 1971. (Note: Nixon toasted the visit with these words: And we are reminded, as I pointed out this morning, of the fact that the United States and all the New World owe so much to Spain, the great courageous explorers who found the New World and who explored it, and that we owe far more than that in culture and language and the other areas with which we are familiar. And all of us who have visited Spain, too, know that it is a magnificent country to visit because of the places of historical interest there, because, also, of the immense and unique warmth and hospitality which characterizes the Spanish people. — Richard Nixon,)

There was a brief strain in relations after the 1981 Spanish coup d'état attempt by neo-Francoist elements in the Civil Guard and Spanish Army, which Secretary of State Alexander Haig referred to as an "internal affair." A month after the coup was suppressed Haig visited Madrid to mend relations with the King, Prime Minister Leopoldo Calvo-Sotelo, and Leader of the Opposition Felipe González to prevent it from interfering with Spain's entry into NATO. Haig also unsuccessfully tried to get Spain to oppose the Communist presence in Central America, including the Sandinista government in Nicaragua.

In regard of the military bases, the 1986 referendum on NATO membership and its result provided the Spanish government led by Felipe González with some leverage vis-à-vis the re-negotiation of the bilateral agreements with the US, and thus Spain asserted a larger degree of sovereignty.

In 1987, Juan Carlos I became the first King of Spain to visit the former Spanish possession of Puerto Rico.

An Agreement on Defense Cooperation was signed by the two countries in 1989 (it was revised in 2003), in which Spain authorized the United States to use certain facilities at Spanish Armed Forces installations. On June 7, 1989, an agreement on cultural and educational cooperation was signed.

On 11 January 2001, US secretary of State Madeleine Albright and Spanish foreign minister Josep Piqué signed a joint declaration updating the terms of the bilateral cooperation, and in which the creation of a consultative bilateral defence committee (first met in May 2003) was agreed.

== 21st century ==
=== Iraq War ===
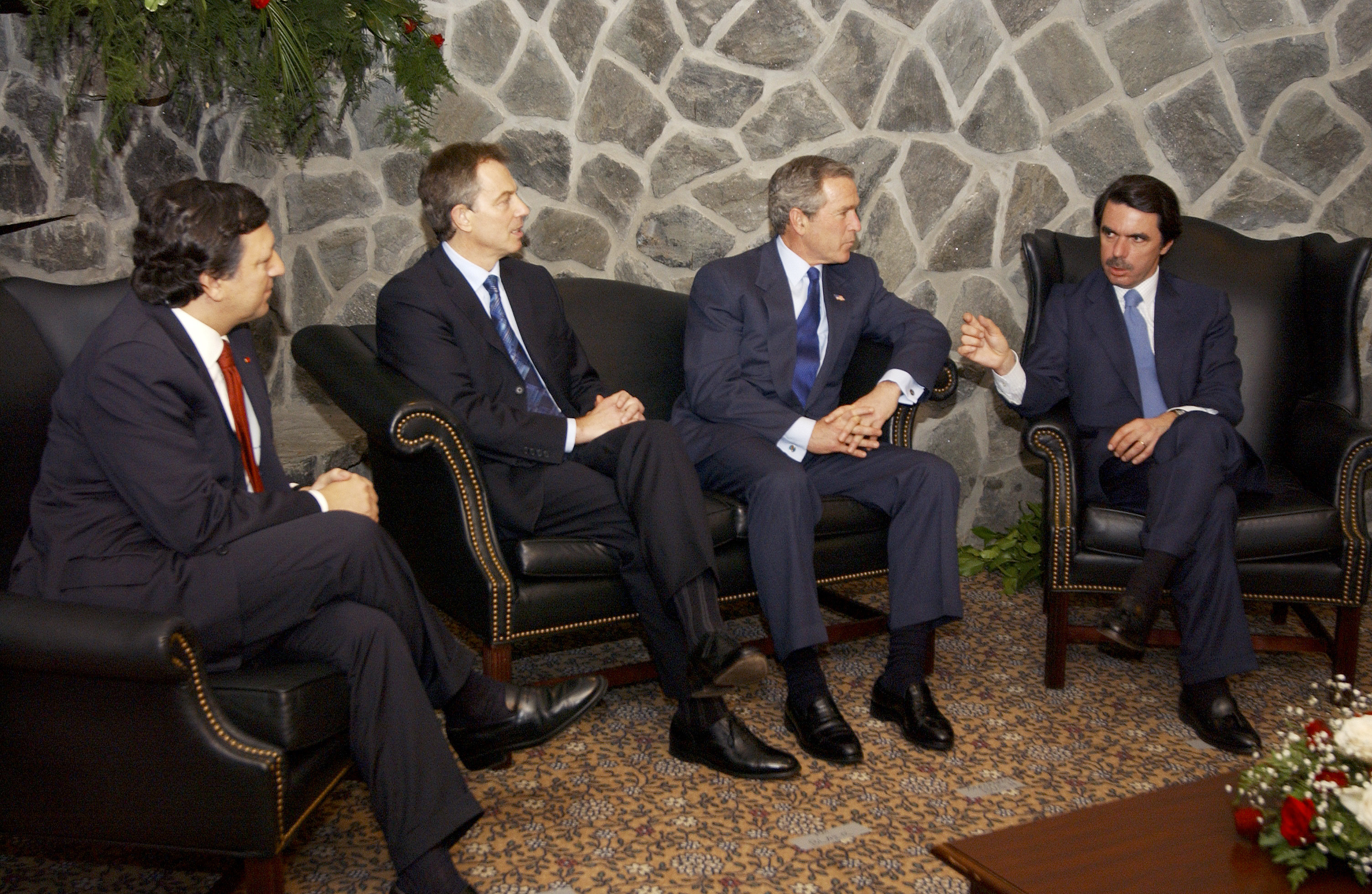
Barroso, Blair, Bush, and Aznar in the Azores

Prime Minister José María Aznar actively supported George W. Bush and UK Prime Minister Tony Blair in the war on terrorism. Aznar met with Bush in a private meeting before 2003 invasion of Iraq to discuss the situation of in the UN Security Council. The Spanish newspaper El País leaked a partial transcript of the meeting. Aznar actively encouraged and supported the Bush administration's foreign policy and the U.S. invasion of Iraq in 2003, and was one of the signatories of the letter of the eight defending it on the basis of secret intelligence allegedly containing evidence of the Iraqi government's nuclear proliferation. The majority of the Spanish population, including some members of Aznar's Partido Popular, were against the war.

After the 2004 Spanish general election, in which the Spanish Socialist Workers' Party received more votes than expected as a result, besides other issues, of the government's handling of the 2004 Madrid train bombings, José Luis Rodríguez Zapatero succeeded Aznar as Prime Minister. Before being elected, Zapatero had opposed the American policy in regard to Iraq pursued by Aznar. During the electoral campaign Zapatero had promised to withdraw the troops if control in Iraq was not passed to the United Nations after June 30 (the ending date of the initial Spanish military agreement with the multinational coalition that had overthrown Saddam Hussein). On April 19, 2004, Zapatero announced the withdrawal of the 1300 Spanish troops in Iraq.

The decision aroused international support worldwide, though the American Government claimed that the terrorists could perceive it as "a victory obtained due to 11 March 2004 Madrid train bombings". John Kerry, the Democratic candidate for the American Presidency, asked Zapatero not to withdraw the Spanish soldiers. Some months after withdrawing the troops, the Zapatero government agreed to increase the number of Spanish soldiers in the War in Afghanistan and to send troops to Haiti to show the Spanish Government's willingness to spend resources on international missions approved by the UN.

=== Bush and Zapatero, 2004–2008 ===
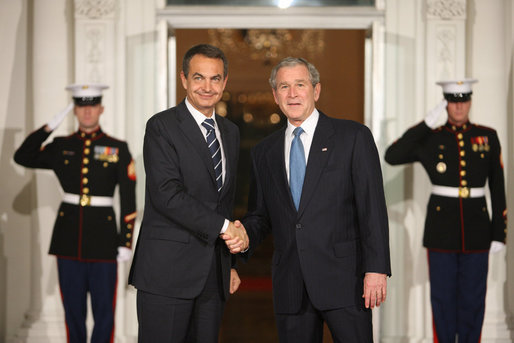
Prime Minister José Luis Rodríguez Zapatero and President George W. Bush meet for the 2008 G-20 Leaders Summit on Financial Markets and the World Economy at the White House in November 2008. Tensions rose between the Zapatero and Bush governments over issues such as the Iraq War.

The withdrawal caused a four-year downturn in relations between Washington and Madrid. A further rift was caused by the fact that Zapatero openly supported Democratic challenger John Kerry on the eve of the U.S. elections in 2004. Zapatero was not invited to the White House until the last months of the Bush administration, nor was Bush invited to La Moncloa. Aznar had visited Washington several times, becoming the first Spanish prime minister to address a joint meeting of Congress, in February 2004. Bush's fellow Republican, and candidate for the 2008 U.S. presidential election, John McCain, refused to commit to a meeting with Zapatero were he to be elected.

Spain under Zapatero turned its focus to Europe from the United States, pursuing a middle road in dealing with tensions between Western powers and Islamic populations. In a May 2007 interview with El País, Daniel Fried, Assistant Secretary for European and Eurasian Affairs, commenting on the overall relationship between Spain and the United States, stated: "We work together very well on some issues. I think the Spanish–American relationship can develop more. I think some Spanish officials are knowledgeable and very skilled professionals and we work with them very well. I would like to see Spain active in the world, working through NATO, active in Afghanistan. You're doing a lot in the Middle East because Moratinos knows a lot about it. But Spain is a big country and your economy is huge. I think Spain can be a force for security and peace and freedom in the world. I believe that Spain has that potential, and that's how I would like to see Spanish–American relations developing."

==== Cuba ====
In 2007, Condoleezza Rice criticized Spain for not doing more to support dissidents in communist Cuba. American officials were irked by the fact that Miguel Ángel Moratinos, Minister of Foreign Affairs, chose not to meet with Cuban dissidents during a visit to the United States in April 2007. "There is no secret that we have had differences with Spain on a number of issues, but we have also had very good cooperation with Spain on a number of issues", Rice remarked. Moratinos defended his decision, believing it better to engage with the Cuban regime than by isolating it. "The U.S. established its embargo", he remarked. "We don't agree with it but we respect it. What we hope is that they respect our policy", Moratinos remarked. "What Spain is not prepared to do is be absent from Cuba. And what the U.S. has to understand is that, given they have no relations with Cuba, they should trust in a faithful, solid ally like Spain."

==== Venezuela and Bolivia ====
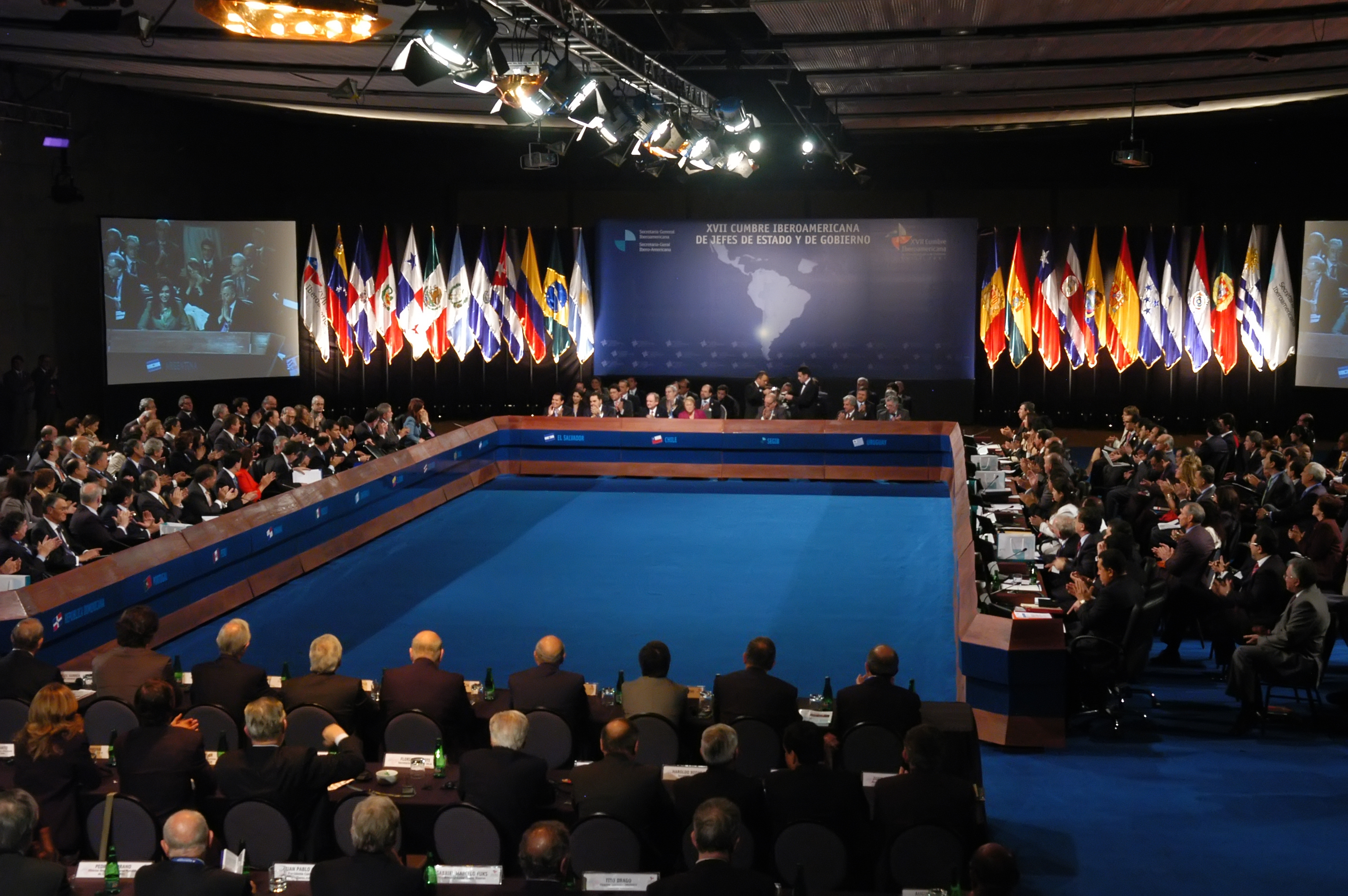
Ibero-American Summit, 2007: Juan Carlos, Zapatero and Chávez are seated on the right.

In addition to policy differences towards Cuba, the United States and Spain have been at variance in their dealings with Venezuela under Hugo Chávez and Bolivia under Evo Morales, both of them socialists. Spain under Zapatero was initially friendly to both regimes. However, Morales’ plan to nationalize the gas sector of Bolivia caused tension with Spain, as Repsol, a Spanish company, has major interests in that South American country. In regards to Venezuela, Zapatero also took issue with Chávez's elected socialist government. Spain's relations with Venezuela were further worsened by the November 10, 2007, incident at the Ibero-American Summit in Santiago, Chile, in which King Juan Carlos told Chávez to "shut up".

Despite its waning support for Chávez, Spain stated in May 2007 that it would pursue a €1.7 billion, or $2.3 billion, contract to sell unarmed aircraft and boats to Venezuela. In 2006, over 200,000 workers were employed by over 600 American firms operating in Spain. They were attracted by that country's low taxes, privatized state-owned companies, and liberalized economy. Furthermore, some 200 Spanish companies operated in the U.S., especially in construction and banking.

=== New stage in relations: 2009–present ===
Three days after Barack Obama was elected president he was congratulated in a brief telephone call from Zapatero. Foreign Minister Miguel Ángel Moratinos visited Washington to meet Secretary of State Hillary Clinton a month after the new American administration was inaugurated. Moratinos told reporters that Spain was ready to take some prisoners from the closing Guantanamo Bay detention camp, provided that the judicial conditions were acceptable. Moratinos also commented that "a new stage in relations between the United States and Spain is opening that is more intense, more productive".

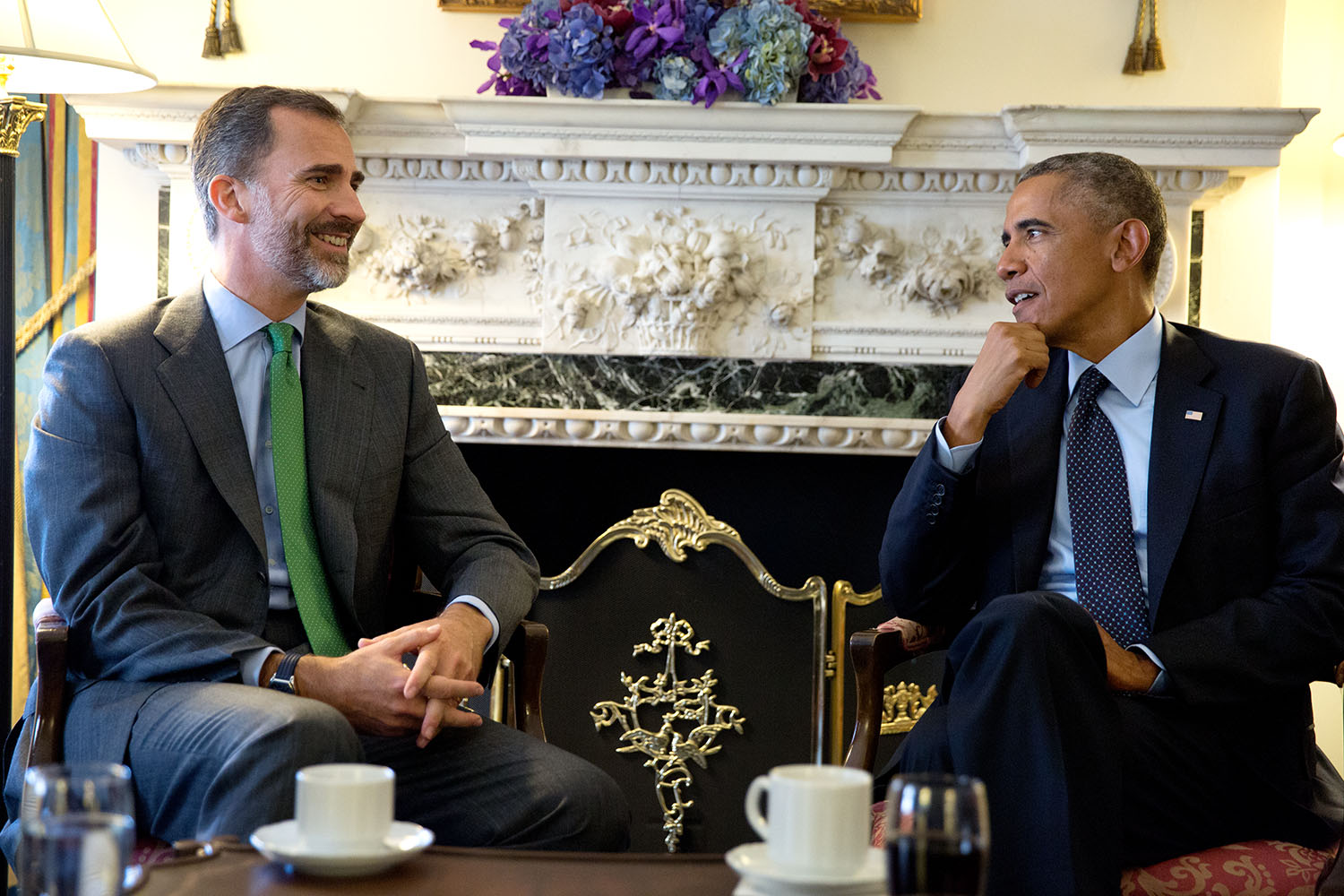
King Felipe VI and President Barack Obama

Obama and Zapatero met face-to-face for the first time on April 2, 2009, at the G20 London Summit. Both leaders participated in the NATO Summit in Strasbourg-Kehl, where Spain committed an additional 450 troops to its previous military contingent of 778 in Afghanistan. Commentators said the decision may have been partially motivated by the Zapatero government's desire to curry favor with the new administration in Washington. Days later at the EU-U.S. Summit in Prague the two held a 45-minute meeting, and afterwards shared a photo-op for the press, where Obama called Zapatero a friend, and said he thinks that the two nations would establish an even stronger relationship in the years to come. This was the first formal meeting between heads of government of Spain and the United States since 2004.

In February 2010, Obama met with Zapatero at the United States Capitol a few days after Obama announced he would not attend the EU-U.S. summit in Madrid in May. Two weeks later, Obama met with King Juan Carlos I. Juan Carlos I was the first European head of state to meet with Obama in the White House, where he has met with John F. Kennedy in 1962, Gerald Ford in 1976, Ronald Reagan in 1987, and Bill Clinton in 1993.

In June 2018 King Felipe VI and Josep Borrell, minister of Foreign Affairs, Cooperation and European Union, made an official visit to the US. They met President Donald Trump on June 19. Meanwhile, Borrell had a meeting with Secretary of State Mike Pompeo, where the Spanish delegation showed concern for the US protectionist drift and discrepancies between the two countries were found in regards to their approach to migration policies.

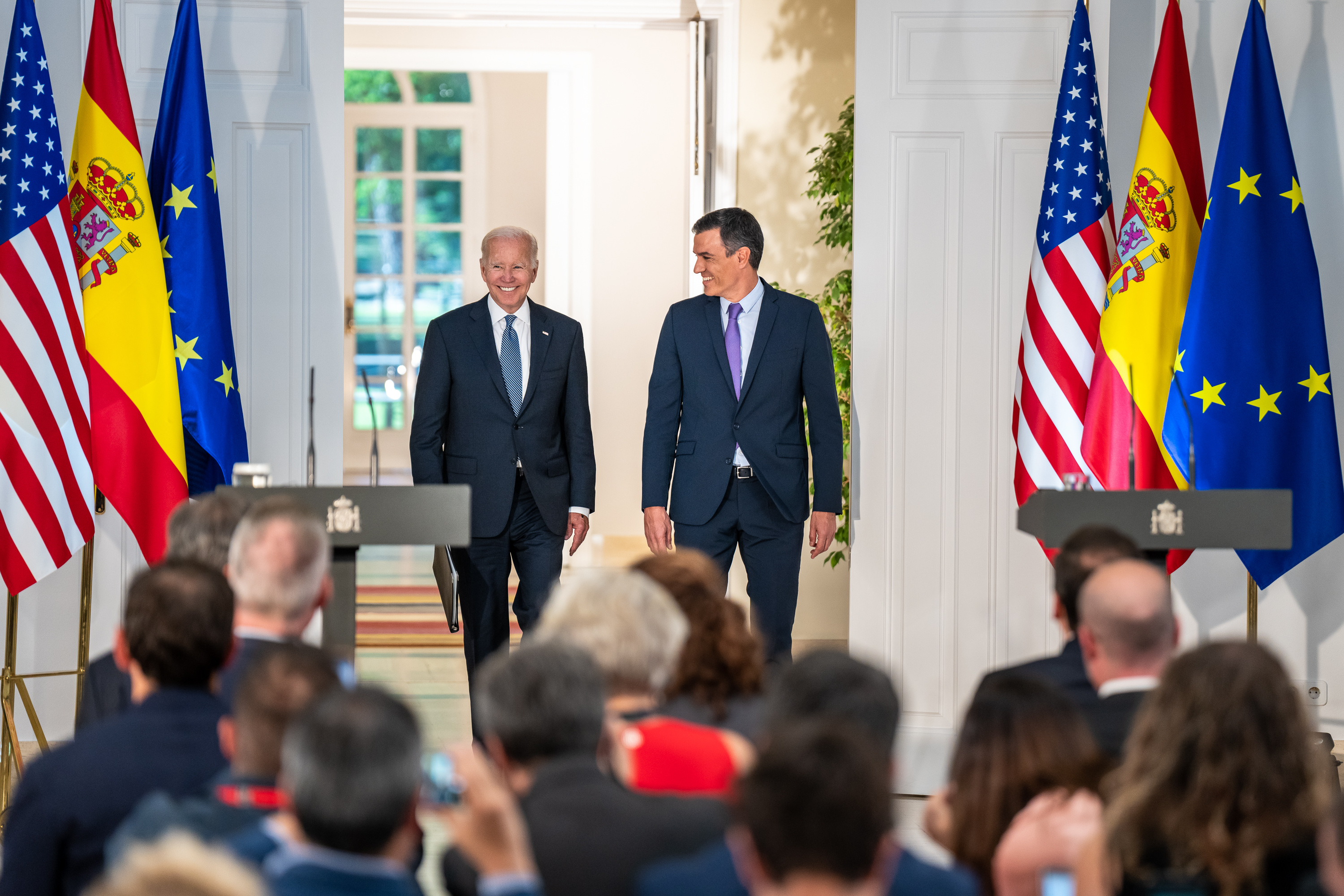
Sánchez and Biden on 28 June 2022 in La Moncloa, after the meeting that launched the updated joint declaration

On 28 June 2022, following a meeting of US president Joe Biden with Spanish prime minister Pedro Sánchez in La Moncloa, both leaders issued a joint declaration to enhance the relations between both countries (updating the 2001 previous joint declaration signed by Josep Piqué and Madeleine Albright), which included an agreement on increasing the number of US warships in Rota and on the importance of permanent cooperation between both countries in response to the challenges of irregular immigration in North Africa.

On 22 June 2025, Spain struck a deal with NATO to not increase defence spending to 5%, on 24 June, during the NATO summit in the Hague, US President Donald Trump commented on this decision by Spain, saying he will double down on Spain by making them pay double the amount through trade and tariffs, PM Pedro Sanchez responded saying Spain won't back down from its decision.

==== Tensions during the Iran war ====
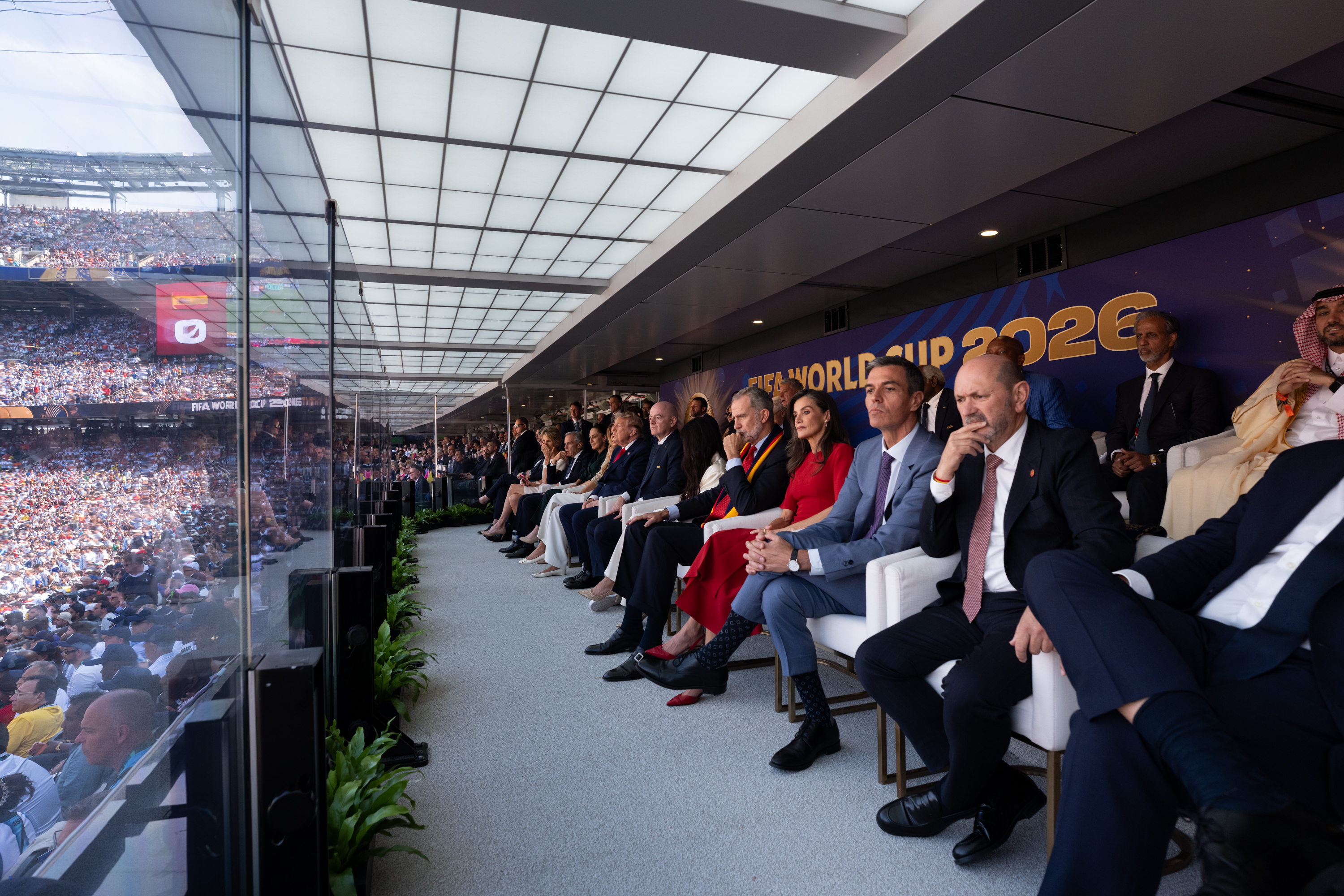
The VIP box at the 2026 FIFA World Cup final, with Donald Trump located at the sixth row from the left, and Pedro Sánchez, Queen Letizia, and Felipe VI located at the second, third, and fourth row from the right.

On 2 March 2026, amid the expanding war between the United States, Israel and Iran, the Spanish government refused a U.S. request to use jointly operated military bases at Rota and Morón for operations against Iran. Prime Minister Pedro Sánchez condemned what he described as U.S. and Israeli “unilateral military action,” stating that Spanish bases would not be used without a United Nations mandate or clear legal basis. A day later, U.S. President Donald Trump responded by announcing that the United States would cut off all trade with Spain, citing the base dispute and Spain's defence spending stance. The Spanish government pushed back firmly, insisting that any review of trade relations must respect international law and the EU-U.S. bilateral agreements that govern commerce. On 4 March, the White House claimed that Spain had agreed to cooperate with the U.S. military, but Spanish officials denied that and said their position had not changed. On 30 March, the Spanish government closed the country's airspace to U.S. planes involved in attacks on Iran. Spanish defense minister Margarita Robles stated that Spain had not authorized the United States to use its military airbases, nor its airspace, for operations related to the war in Iran.

During the 2026 conflict between the United States, Israel, and Iran, Spanish Prime Minister Pedro Sánchez condemned the military actions of the United States. He announced that Spain would not support the use of its military bases or airspace for attacks on Iran and stated that continued hostilities could destabilize the Middle East and endanger civilians. Sánchez described the escalation as a serious mistake and called for diplomatic solutions and adherence to international law.

In April 2026, a leaked Pentagon email revealed that the United States was considering suspending Spain from NATO over its refusal to grant access to military bases on Spanish territory for strikes against Iran. Experts noted that the US cannot unilaterally suspend a NATO member, but the incident highlighted deepening tensions between the two allies. Moreover, a senior figure at the American Foreign Policy Council labeled Spain, rather than Turkey, as NATO's "weakest link" due to its government's anti-American rhetoric, refusal to meet defense spending targets, and growing strategic alignment with China. In July 2026, tensions further escalated when U.S. President Donald Trump ordered a halt to economic ties and visits with Spain during the 2026 NATO summit over its defense spending commitments, describing Spain as a "terrible partner." Spanish Prime Minister Pedro Sánchez sought to ease tensions, saying that he had held a "very cordial" conversation with Trump during the summit.

In April 2026, United States House Committee on Appropriations member Mario Díaz-Balart added text to a report stating that the Spanish cities of Ceuta and Melilla, both claimed by Morocco, are "located in Moroccan territory". This report became attached to bill H.R. 8595, which was passed by the house on 15 July by 217 to 209, with all but one member of the Republican Party voting for it. On 6 August 2026, during the 2026 Ceuta migrant crossing crisis, US State Department spokesman Tommy Pigott stated that his country "unequivocally supports Spain's sovereignty over Ceuta and Melilla", and that the congressional report was not part of US law. Pigott blamed the crisis on "the Spanish government's refusal to defend their sovereignty, secure their borders, and protect their people".

== Economic relations ==
Both countries are developed OECD members and have signed various economic agreements, including a double taxation agreement. In 2024, the US imported $21.3 billion worth of goods from Spain and exported $24.7 billion worth of goods to Spain in return. US companies are the largest foreign investor in Spain, accounting for 18.8% of FDI in 2021. Together, both countries are also significant investors in Latin America. Numerous American tourists visit Spain every year, with three million visiting in 2019.

== Cultural relations ==
Spanish language in the US (2019)

The conquest of parts of the Americas by Spain before 1700 has led to numerous influences from the Spanish colonial empire in the United States. Parts of these were transferred to the US with the annexation of Florida and northwestern Mexico. Spanish influences have been preserved in the architecture, cuisine, and culture of the US. In addition to the ethnically mixed group of Hispanics, there is also a group of Hispanos in the US who are direct descendants of Spanish settlers in New Mexico. Almost 60 million people in the US speak Spanish, just under a fifth of the population and more than the population of Spain. In some regions of the country, Spanish has an informal status as a second official language. In the US territory of Puerto Rico, it is the official language alongside English. Spain is the third most popular country for foreign students from the US.

However, cultural relations have remained ambivalent. According to a study by the German Marshall Fund, feelings toward the United States in Spain are among the least positive in Europe. Reasons for this include memories of the Spanish-American War, support for Francisco Franco's dictatorship, and US interventions in Spanish-speaking Latin America. This sentiment is not limited to the left; anti-Americanism is also widespread among the right. During World War II, overt right-wing anti-Americanism, led by the Church, the armed forces, and the Falange, led Falange members to become advocates of a worldview shaped by Hispanidad, which was at odds with the Monroe Doctrine.

A 2017 survey conducted by the Pew Research Center found that 60% of Spaniards had a negative view of the US, while only 31% had a positive view, which could also be explained by the popularity of then-US President Donald Trump, which stood at only 7%. By 2021, the image of the US had improved, with 60% of Spaniards now having a positive attitude toward the US and only 30% having a negative one.

== Resident diplomatic missions ==
of Spain in the United States

- Washington, D.C. (Embassy)
- Boston (Consulate-General)
- Chicago (Consulate-General)
- Houston (Consulate-General)
- Los Angeles (Consulate-General)
- Miami (Consulate-General)
- New York City (Consulate-General)
- San Francisco (Consulate-General)
- San Juan (Consulate-General)

of the United States in Spain

- Madrid (Embassy)
- Barcelona (Consulate-General)
- Fuengirola (Consular Agency)
- Las Palmas (Consular Agency)
- Palma de Mallorca (Consular Agency)
- Seville (Consular Agency)
- Valencia (Consular Agency)

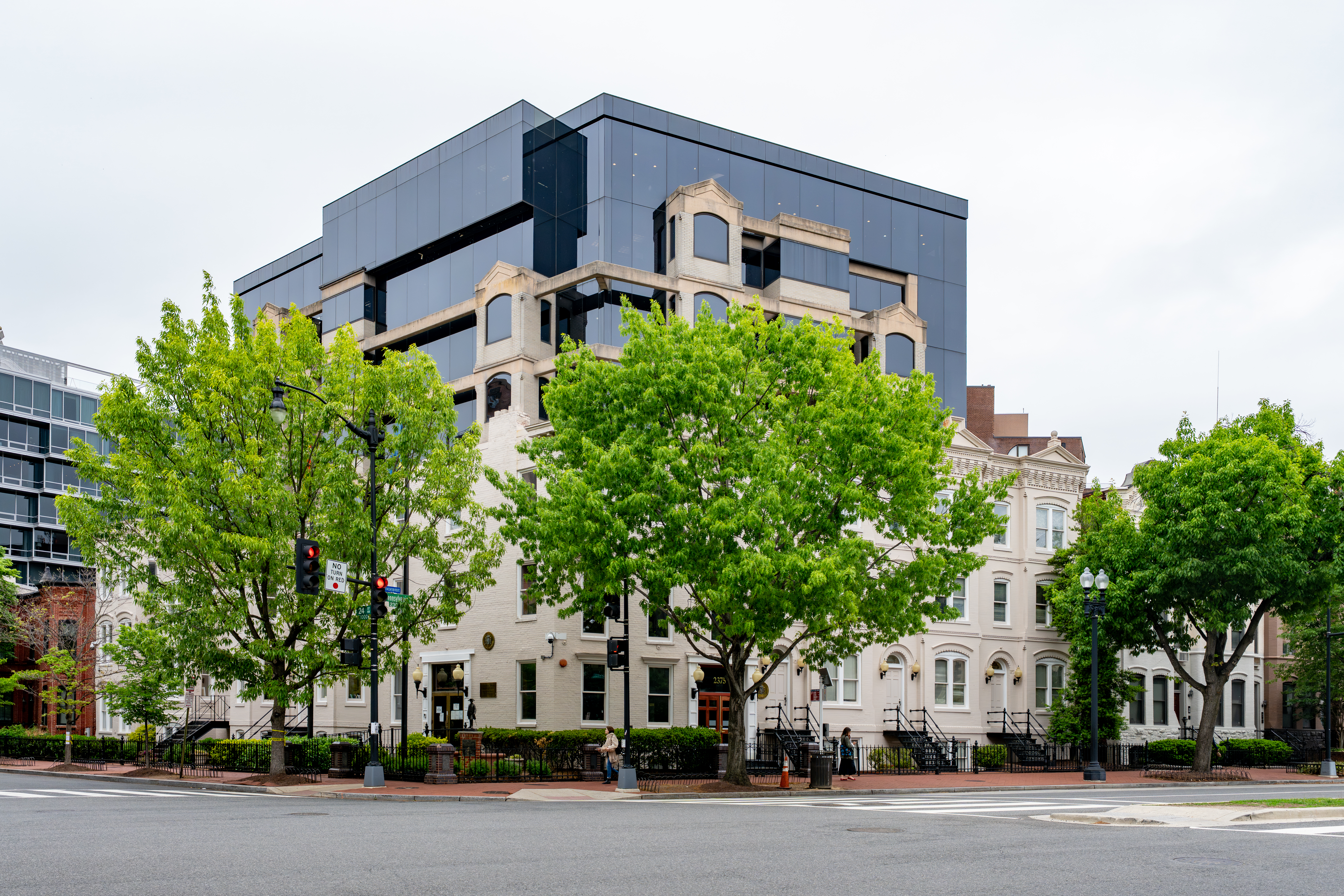
Embassy of Spain in Washington, D.C.

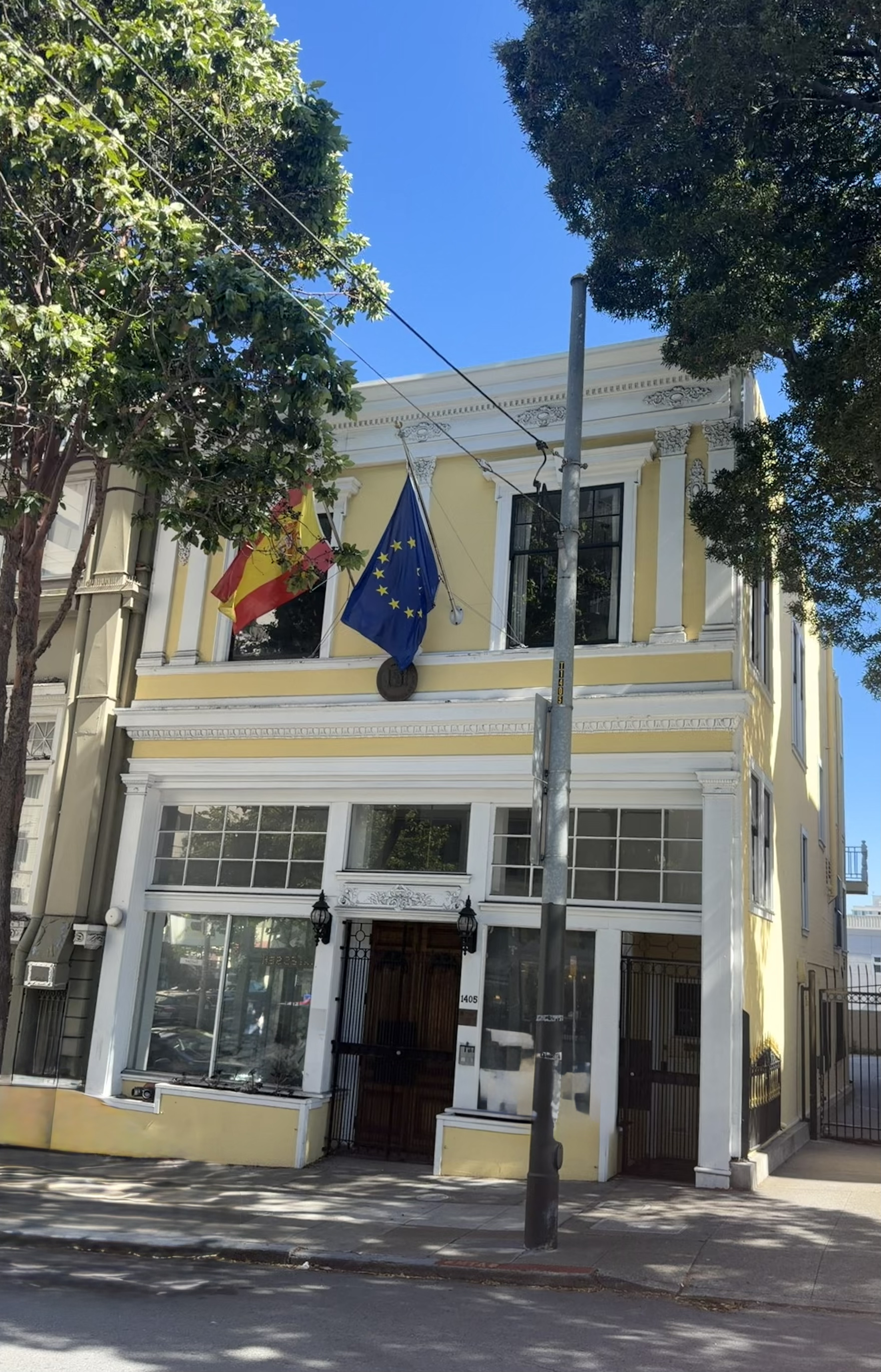
Consulate-General of Spain in San Francisco

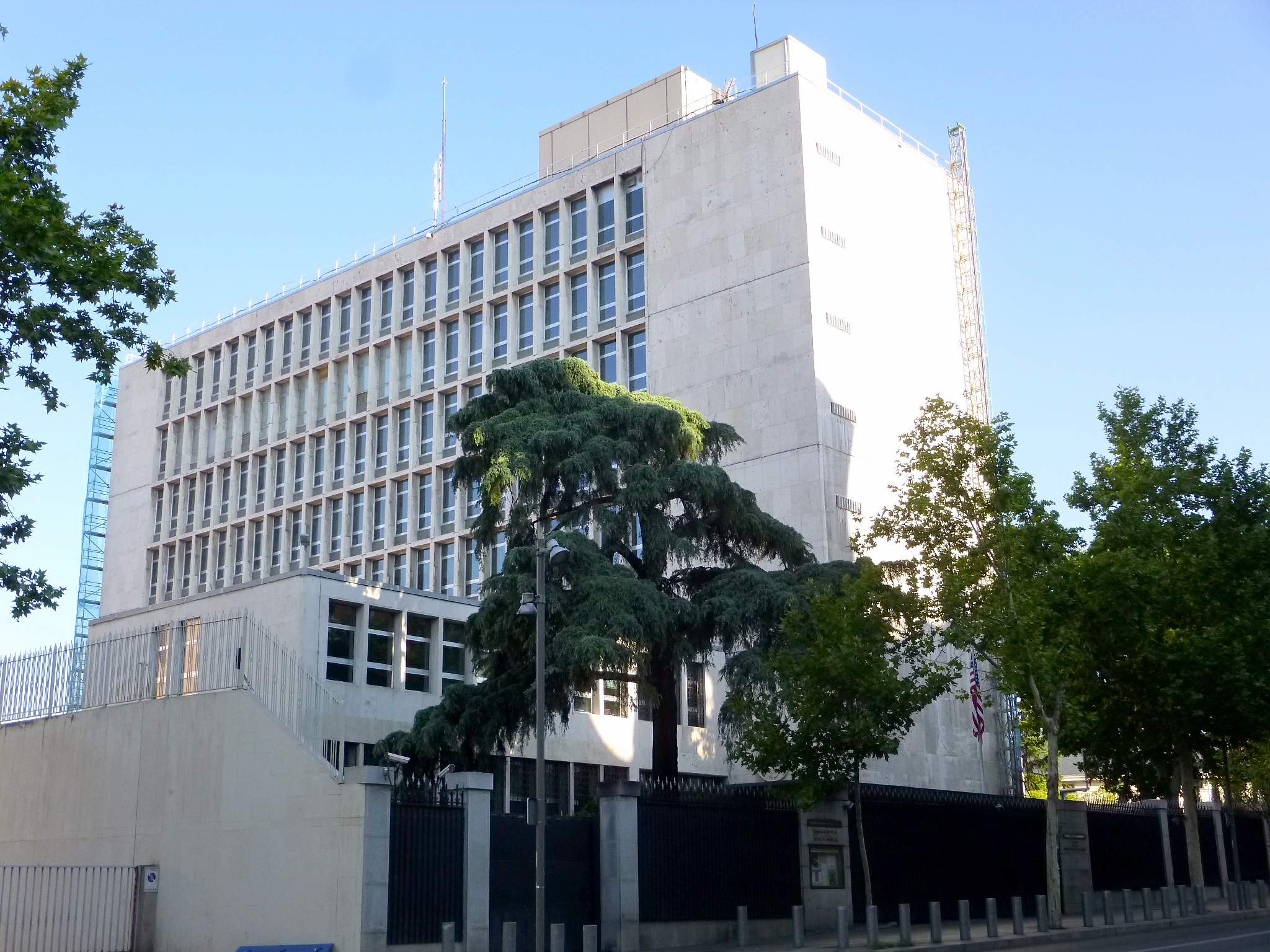
Embassy of the United States in Madrid

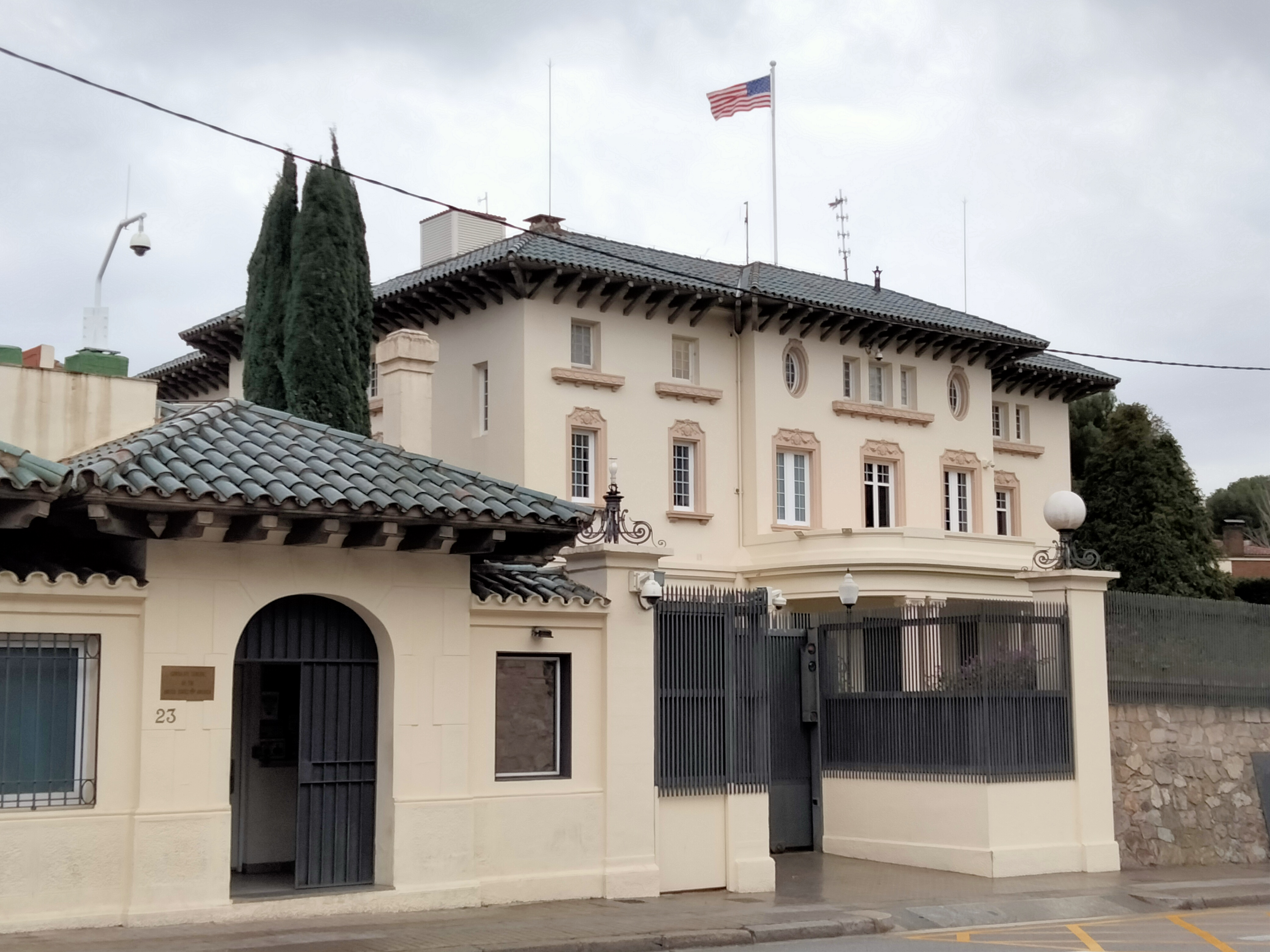
Consulate-General of the United States in Barcelona

== Polls ==
According to 2012 the USA Global Leadership Report, 34% of Spaniards approve of U.S. leadership, with 33% disapproving and 34% uncertain. According to a 2013 BBC World Service Poll, 43% of Spanish people view the US influence positively, with only 25% expressing a negative view. A 2017 survey conducted by the Pew Research Center showed 60% of Spaniards had a negative view of the US, with only 31% having a positive view. The same study also showed only 7% of Spaniards had confidence in President Donald Trump, with 70% having no confidence in him. According to a 2025 YouGov poll, 58% of Spaniards see tensions with the United States as a major or moderate threat to continental peace. According to a 2026 Pew Research Center survey, 30% of Spaniards had a favorable view of the United States, while 67% had a negative view.

== See also ==
- Basque Americans
- List of ambassadors of Spain to the United States
- List of ambassadors of the United States to Spain
- Spanish Americans
- United States Air Forces in Europe
- Anti-American sentiment in Spain
- EU–US relations
- European Union–NATO relations
