= Embassy of the United States, Madrid =

Embassy of the United States in Madrid, Spain

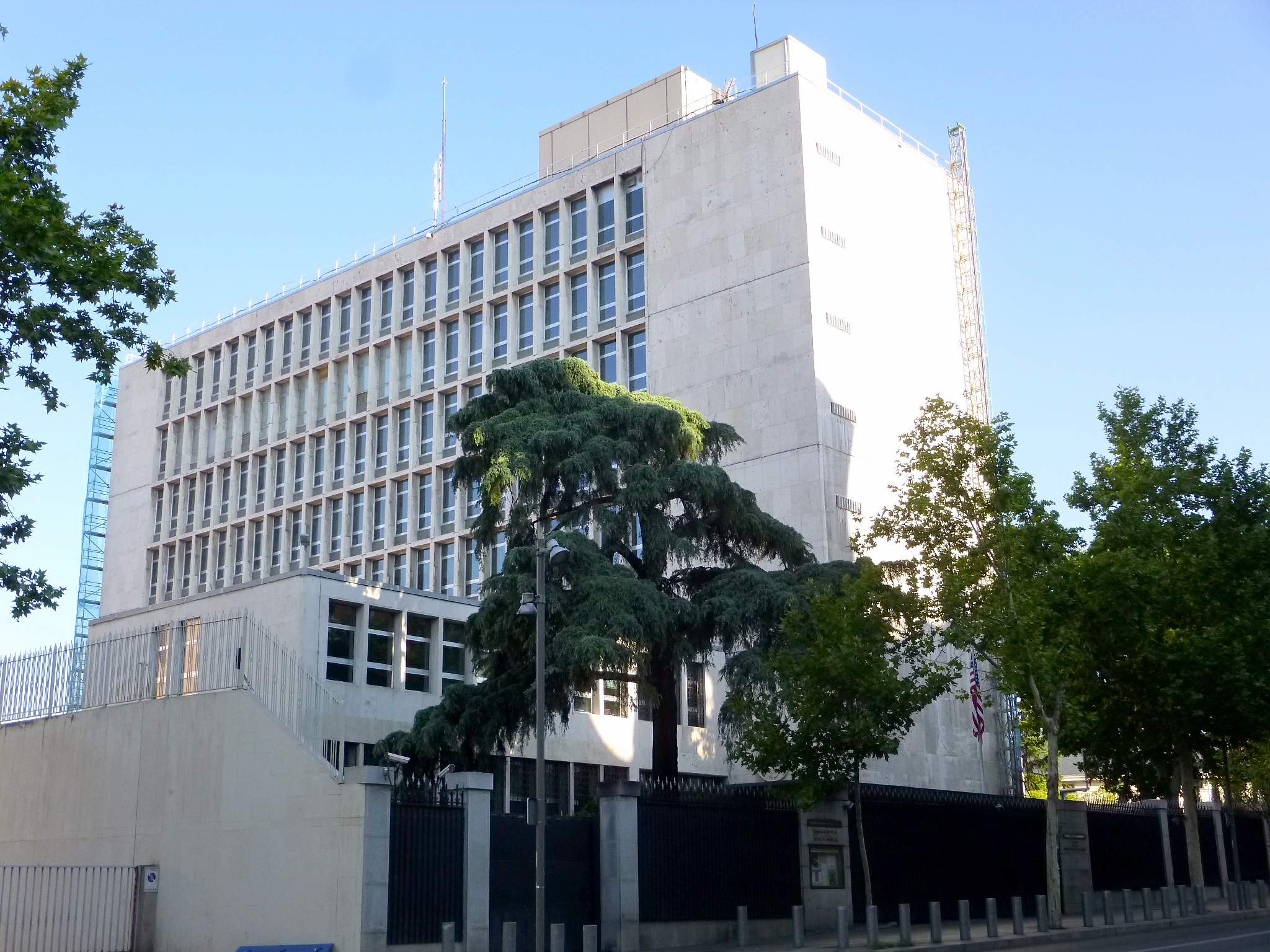
- Location: Madrid, Spain
- Address: Calle de Serrano, 75, 28006
- Coordinates: 40°26′05″N 3°41′14″W
- Opened: Between 1951 and 1955

The Embassy of the United States, Madrid is a building located in the city of Madrid that houses the Embassy of the United States in Spain. The U.S. Ambassador to Spain also concurrently serves as the Ambassador to Andorra, with the U.S. Consul General in Barcelona taking active part in managing day-to-day relations with Andorra.

== History ==
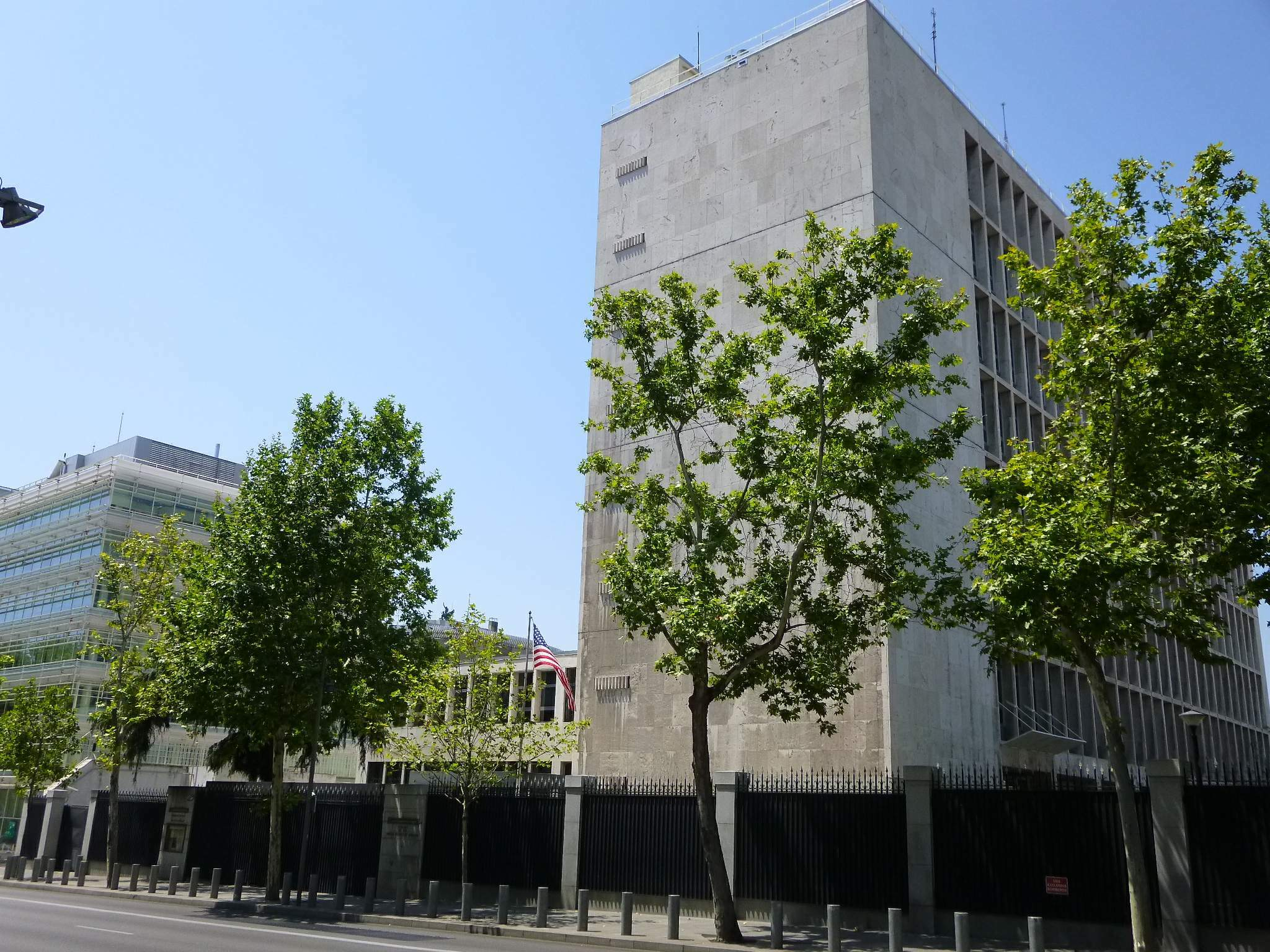
Embassy of the United States in Madrid

The Continental Congress sent John Jay to Spain in 1779 to persuade the Spanish Court to recognize the United States. Jay was not successful, and it was only in 1783 that Spain formally recognized the United States through the reception of William Carmichael as Chargé d'Affaires ad interim. As a result of the Spanish-American War of 1898, relations were severed and the U.S. Minister Stewart Woodford closed the legation. However, diplomatic relations were restored when Bellamy Storer presented his credentials in Spain on June 16, 1899.

Joseph Edward Willard was appointed as Envoy but was elevated to the rank of Ambassador, presenting his credentials on October 31, 1913, marking a significant development in diplomatic relations between the two countries. Due to the turmoil of the Spanish Civil War, the American Embassy was temporarily moved to the U.S. consulate in Barcelona and later to St. Jean de Luz, France. The Embassy was re-established in Spain on April 13, 1939, with H. Freeman Matthews recognized as Chargé d’Affaires ad interim in Burgos.

== Architecture ==
The embassy is located at 75 Serrano Street in the Salamanca district, with the plot also bordering paseo de la Castellana.

It was one of the first examples of international style architecture in the Spanish capital, and was inspired by the design of the U.S. embassy in Havana. It was designed by Ernest Warlow and Leland W. King with the collaboration of the Spanish architect Mariano Garrigues, on a plot where the palace of the Marchioness of Argüelles once stood. Designed in 1950, construction took place between 1951 and 1955. In the 1950s, the building was criticized by the Madrid press because of the contrast its modern design offered compared to the surrounding 19th-century buildings.

== Bibliography ==
- Delgado Orusco, Eduardo (2015). Teresa Couceiro Núñez (Coord.) (ed.). The United States Embassy in Madrid: Leland W. King, Ernest Warlon, and Mariano Garrigues and Díaz-Cañabate. 1950-1955 (PDF). II Congress Pioneers of Modern Spanish Architecture: Learning from a work.: Digital Proceedings of Communications accepted to the Congress. pp. 212–226. ISBN 978-84-606-7879-3.
- Fraguas, Rafael (June 16, 2004). Millennial Madrid.

== See also ==
- Embassy of Spain, Washington, D.C.
- List of ambassadors of the United States to Spain
- Spain–United States relations
