= Anti-American sentiment in Spain =

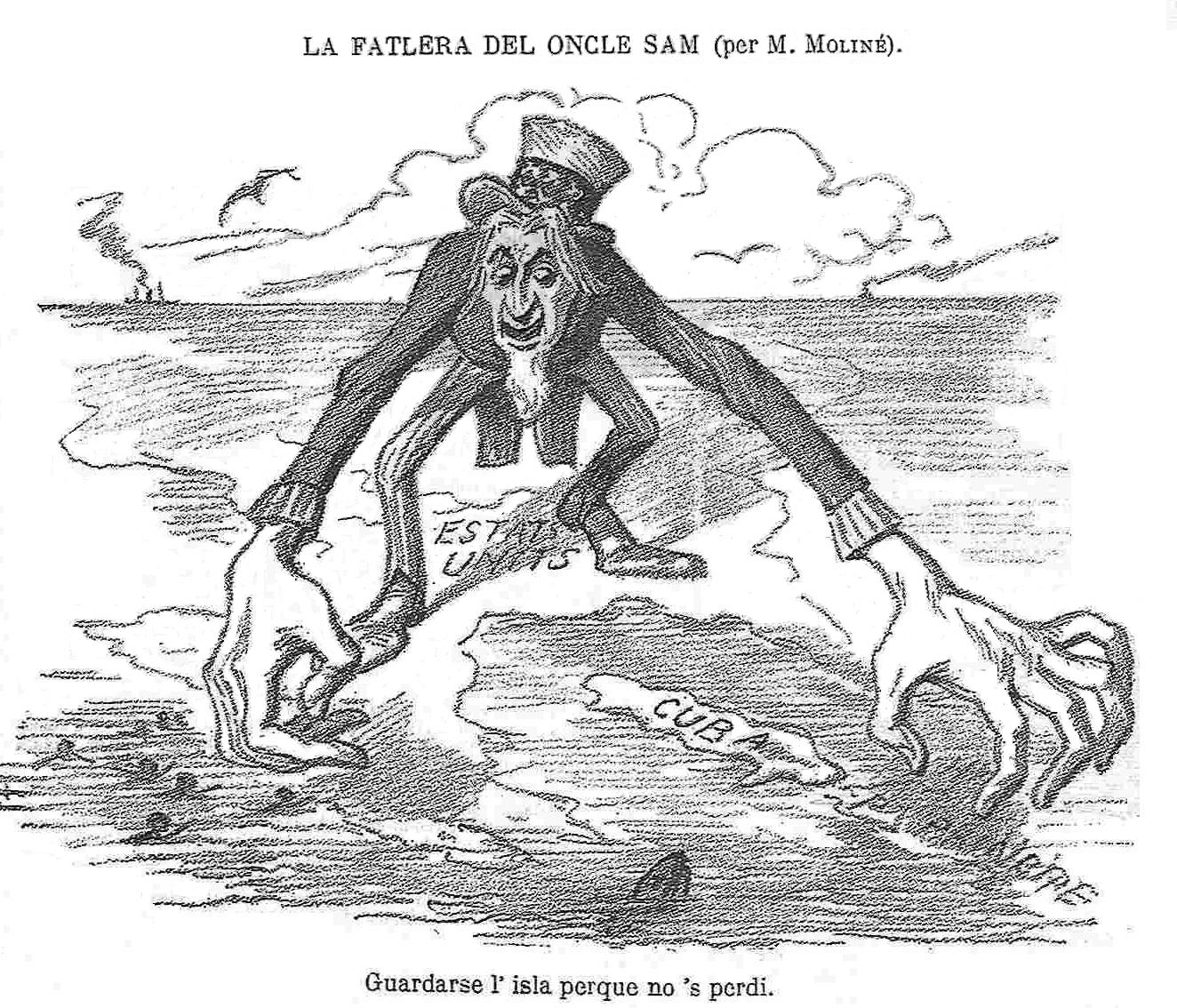
A 1896 political cartoon criticising the intentions of American imperialism concerning Cuba

Anti-American sentiment surveys conducted in Spain tend to reveal a level of anti-Americanism which ranks among the highest in Europe. According to a German Marshall Fund study, feelings towards the United States in Spain were among the least favourable in Europe, second only to Turkey. The sentiment has been historically far from being only left-wing in nature, but the United States is viewed very negatively by right-wing factions in Spain.

The Spanish–American War in 1898 as the point of origin of anti-Americanism in Spain has been a common theme of historiography of the topic, although the extent has been recently disputed, as negative stereotypes about the United States and Americans date as far back as the US Declaration of Independence in 1776. The spread of prejudices and clichés against the United States that were common in Europe in the 19th and the 20th centuries found a fertile ground in Spain. In the 19th century, Spanish anti-Americanism, which was staunchly conservative, developed by a discourse of Panhispanism, which framed the US as an enemy of Spanish interests and of Catholicism.

The 1898 war was perceived in the US as a "splendid little war" but as a national disaster to many in Spain. However, despite the attempts from the most obstinate right-wingers, who continued to engage in feeding anti-American sentiment, the immediate aftermath left a focus on self-criticism and a grave crisis in the "national psyche", rather than a prevalence of revanchist stances in public opinion.

According to Alessandro Seregni, 20th-century anti-American sentiment was built upon two different political cultures ("groups" or "families") in Spain: one right-wing and another left-wing.

During the Second World War, unabashed right-wing anti-Americanism, led by the Church, the Armed Forces, and the Falange had Falange members become sponsors of a worldview underpinned by hispanidad, which clashed with the Monroe Doctrine. After the end of the war, right-wing anti-Americanism became more defensive. Criticism and condemnation of American imperialism was widespread in Spain in the 1960s and the 1970s. US involvement in foreign nations in the 1970s (often endorsing anti-democratic regimes) further tarnished the country's reputation to left-wing sensibilities.

For many authors, the higher prevalence of anti-Americanism in Spain to that nearby nations is because of the memory of the 1898 war and the left-wing resentment of the US partnership with Franco. Also, the Pact of Madrid to install US military bases in Spain in 1953, the Americans' lack of enthusiasm for the Spanish transition to democracy in the 1970s, the US endorsement of far-right dictatorships in Latin America during the Reagan administration, and the invasion of Iraq (including the killing of José Couso) are also cited as events that fuel anti-Americanism. Spain was even the European country with the highest levels of opposition in public opinion to the Iraq War.
