= Embassy of Spain, Washington, D.C. =

Diplomatic mission of the Kingdom of Spain to the United States

Spanish Embassy, Washington, D.C.
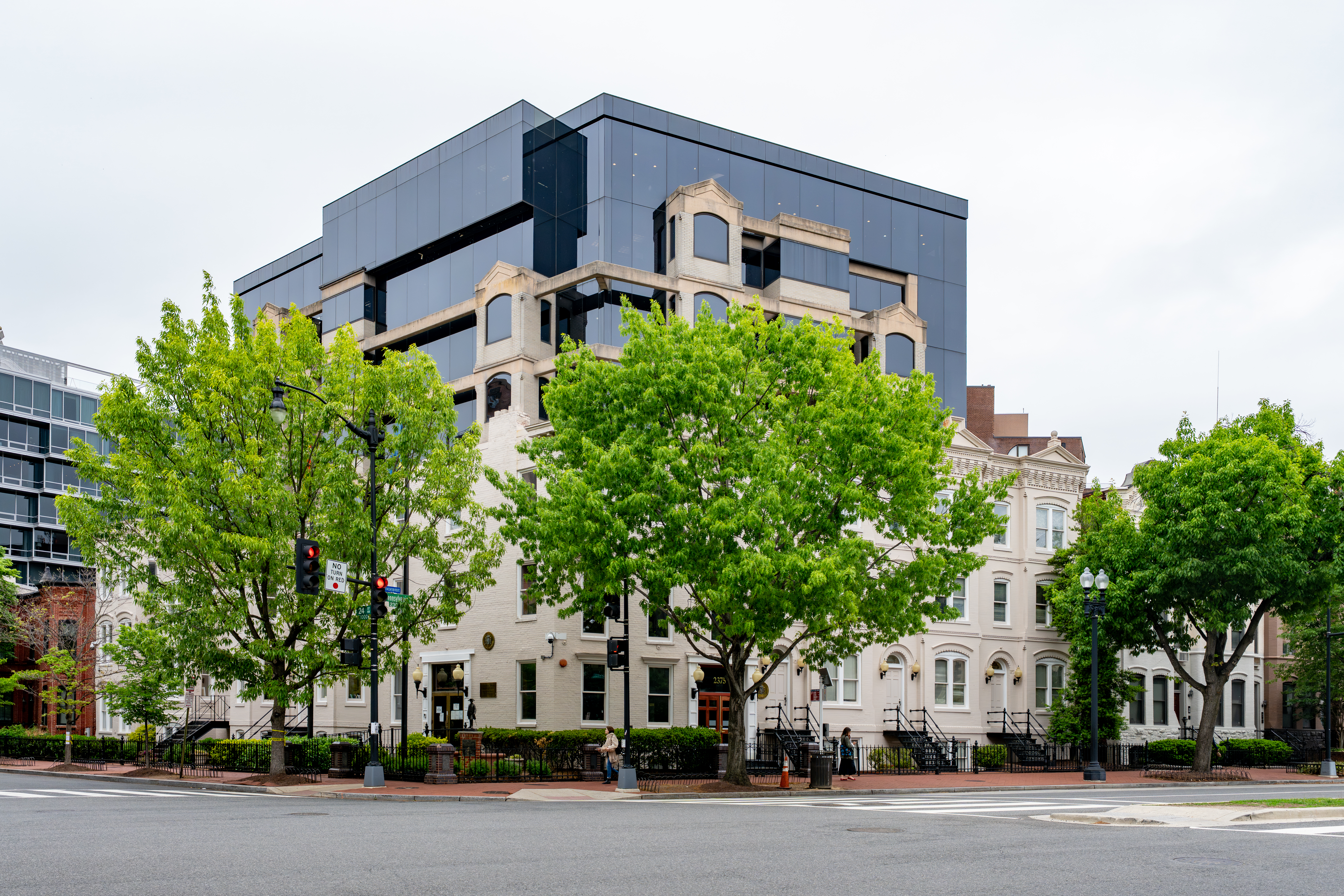
- Location: Washington, D.C.
- Address: 2375 Pennsylvania Avenue, N.W.
- Coordinates: 38°54′11.6″N 77°3′4″W

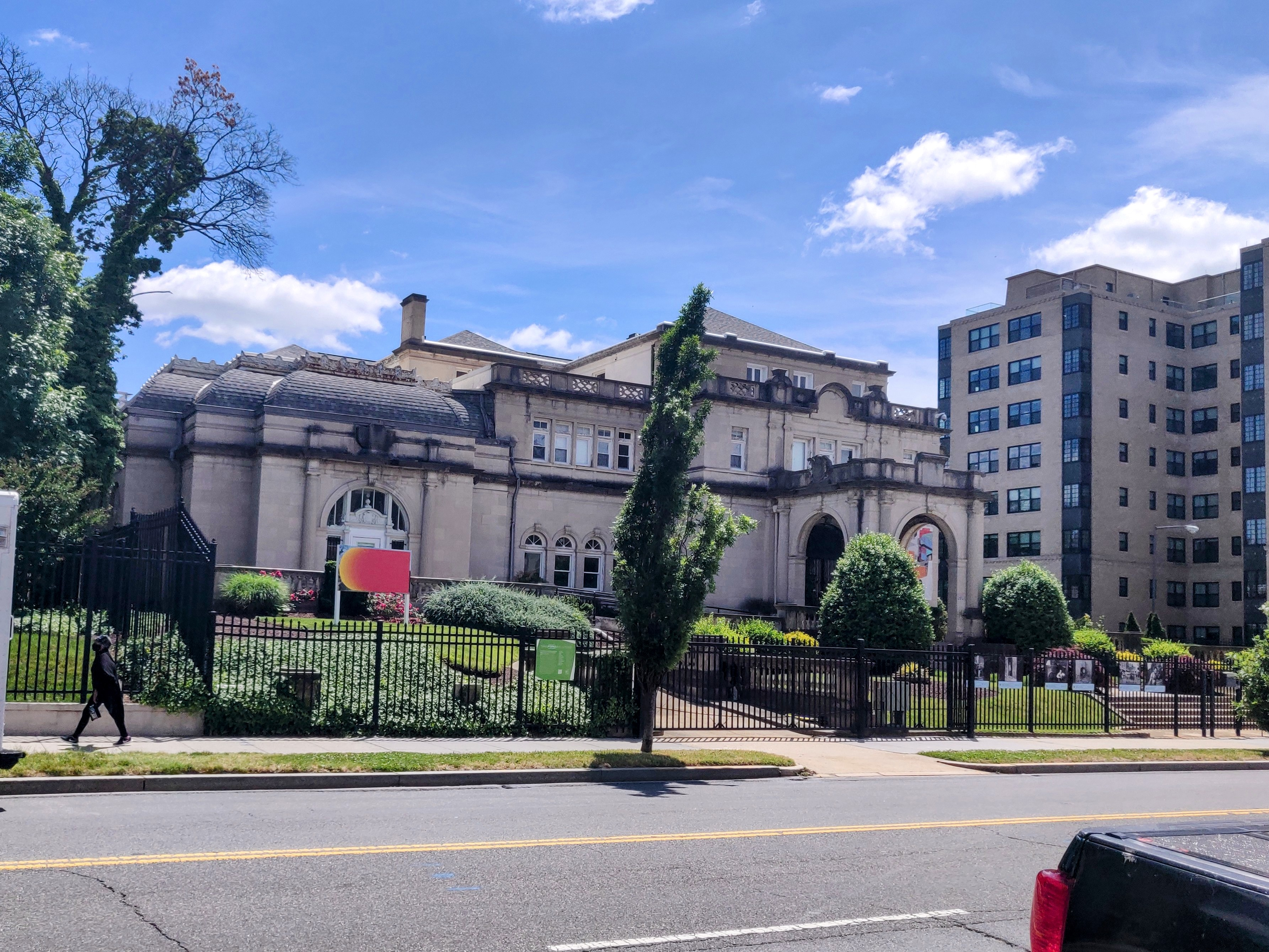
Spanish Cultural Institute located on 2801 16th Street, Washington, D.C.

The Embassy of Spain in Washington, D.C. is the diplomatic mission of the Kingdom of Spain to the United States It is located at 2375 Pennsylvania Avenue NW, in the West End neighborhood.

Spain did not establish diplomatic relations with the United States until 1790, after the ratification of the 1783 Treaty of Paris ending hostilities between the United States and the Kingdom of Great Britain. Diplomatic relations were broken off from 1808 to 1814 over American occupation of West Florida, and again from April 1898 to April 1899 during the Spanish–American War.

The embassy has been located at 2375 Pennsylvania Avenue NW since 1994. The Spanish Embassy was formerly located at 2801 16th Street NW., where the current Cultural Office of the Embassy is situated.

Queen Sofía of Spain visited the embassy in September 2025.

== See also ==
- List of Ambassadors of Spain to the United States
- Architecture of Washington, D.C.

== Bibliography ==
- Beisner, Robert L. American Foreign Relations Since 1600: A Guide to the Literature. Santa Barbara, Calif.: ABC-CLIO, 2003.
- Hodges, Allan A. and Hodges, Carol A. Washington on Foot: 23 Walking Tours of Washington, D.C., Old Town Alexandria, Virginia, and Historic Annapolis, Maryland. Washington, D.C.: Smithsonian Institution Press, 1980.
- Pennsylvania Avenue Scenic Byway: Corridor Management Plan. Department of Transportation. Government of the District of Columbia. April 2006.
- World Almanac and Encyclopedia. New York: Press Publishing Co., 1901.
