= Main Building =

Main Building is a common name for a building on some university and college campuses serving as home to administrative offices, such as president or provost and may refer to:

== Austria ==
- Main building (University of Vienna)

== Canada ==
- Main Building (Statistics Canada)

== Hong Kong ==
- HSBC Main Building, Hong Kong, the headquarters of The Hongkong and Shanghai Banking Corporation

== Iceland ==
- University of Iceland Main Building

== Philippines ==
- Main Building (University of Santo Tomas)

== Russia ==
- Ministry of Foreign Affairs of Russia main building, Moscow
- Main building of Moscow State University

== Sweden ==
- Lund University Main Building

== United Kingdom ==
- UCL Main Building, at University College London
- Ministry of Defence Main Building (United Kingdom), Whitehall, London

== United States ==
- Main Building, Arkansas Baptist College, Little Rock, Arkansas
- Main Building (Torrance High School), at Torrance High School in Torrance, California
- Main Building (University of Notre Dame), South Bend, Indiana
- Main Building (University of Kentucky), at the University of Kentucky in Lexington, Kentucky
- Xavier University Main Building, Convent and Library, New Orleans, Louisiana
- Main Building, Concordia College, a National Register of Historic Places listing in Clay County, Minnesota
- Camden Free Public Library Main Building, Camden, New Jersey
- New Mexico Military Institute Summer Camp, Main Building, a National Register of Historic Places listing in Lincoln County, New Mexico
- Low Memorial Library, Columbia University, New York, New York
- Hudson River State Hospital, Main Building, Poughkeepsie, New York
- Main Building (Vassar College), Poughkeepsie, New York
- Main Building, Louisburg College, Louisburg, North Carolina, built by Albert Gamaliel Jones
- North Carolina School for the Deaf: Main Building, Morganton, North Carolina, built by A.G. Bauer
- Peace College Main Building, Raleigh, North Carolina
- Main Building, Mitchell College, Statesville, North Carolina
- Main Building School, Wilmington, Ohio
- Main Building, U.S. Bureau of Mines, Pittsburgh, Pennsylvania
- Lander College Old Main Building, Greenwood, South Carolina
- All Saints School Main Building, Sioux Falls, South Dakota
- Main Building (St. Edward's University), Austin, Texas
- Main Building (University of Texas at Austin)
- Main Building, Blinn College, a National Register of Historic Places listing in Washington County, Texas
- Main Building (University of Houston–Downtown) or Merchants and Manufacturers Building, Houston, Texas
- Old Main (Texas State University) or Main Building, Southwest Texas Normal School, San Marcos, Texas
- Main Building of Dixie College, a National Register of Historic Places listing in Washington County, Utah
- Southern Seminary Main Building, Buena Vista, Virginia
- Main Building (Montgomery, West Virginia)
- Mary Baldwin College, Main Building, Staunton, Virginia

== See also ==
- Administration Building (disambiguation)
- List of Old Main buildings
