= Administration Building =

Administration Building may refer to:

== Canada ==
=== Saskatchewan ===
- Administration Building, University of Saskatchewan

== United States ==
=== California ===
- Administration Building, Treasure Island, Treasure Island, California
- Atascadero Administration Building, Atascadero, CA
- Riverside County Administration Building, Riverside, California

=== Florida ===
- Administration Buildings (Boca Raton, Florida)
- Croissant Park Administration Building, Fort Lauderdale, Florida
- Opa-locka Company administration building, Opa-Locka, Florida

=== Idaho ===
- Administration Building, University of Idaho, Moscow, ID

=== Indiana ===
- Administration Building, Indiana Central University, Indianapolis, IN
- Main Administration Building (University of Notre Dame), South Bend, Indiana

=== Illinois ===
- Sears, Roebuck and Company Administration Building, Chicago

=== Kansas ===
- Administration Building (McConnell Air Force Base), Wichita, Kansas

=== Maryland ===
- Victor Cullen Center, Old Administration Building, Sabillasville, Maryland

=== Minnesota ===
- Administration Building-Girls' Dormitory, Minnesota School for the Deaf, Faribault, Minnesota
- Administration Building-Minnesota State Public School For Dependent and Neglected Children, Owatonna, MN
- Holman Field Administration Building, Saint Paul, Minnesota
- Theodore Wirth House–Administration Building, Minneapolis, Minnesota

=== Mississippi ===
- Aubrey K. Lucas Administration Building (University of Southern Mississippi)

=== Missouri ===
- Administration Building, Missouri State Fruit Experiment Station, Mountain Grove, Missouri

=== Montana ===
- Administration Building (Fort Peck, Montana)

=== Nebraska ===
- Eugene C. Eppley Administration Building, Omaha, Nebraska

=== New Mexico ===
- Administration Building (Alamogordo, New Mexico) (New Mexico School for the Blind and Visually Impaired
- Administration Building (Portales, New Mexico), (Eastern New Mexico University)

=== New York ===
- Buffalo Psychiatric Center – Administration Building, Buffalo, New York
- Fonthill Castle and the Administration Building of the College of Mount St. Vincent, The Bronx, New York, New York

=== Ohio ===
- Administration Building (Lake Erie College), Painesville, Ohio
- Akron Fulton International Airport Administration Building, Akron, Ohio

=== Oregon ===
- Inlow Hall (Eastern Oregon University)

=== Pennsylvania ===
- Administration Building, Washington and Jefferson College, Washington, Pennsylvania

=== South Carolina ===
- Chappelle Administration Building, Columbia, South Carolina

=== Texas ===
- Administration Building (Austin, Texas), a historic building of Huston-Tillotson University
- Administration Building, Decatur Baptist College, Decatur, Texas
- Hugh Roy and Lillie Cullen Building, Georgetown, Texas, a historic building of Southwestern University
- Administration Building (Texas Tech University), Lubbock, Texas
- Administration Building (Randolph Air Force Base), Universal City, Texas

=== Tennessee ===
- Administration Building (University of Memphis)

=== Utah ===
- Church Administration Building, Salt Lake City, Utah
- Old Administration Building (Bryce Canyon National Park), Bryce Canyon, Utah

=== Washington ===
- Administration Building (Seattle University)
- Gerberding Hall, formerly the Administration Building, at the University of Washington
- King County Administration Building, Seattle, Washington

=== Washington D.C. ===
- Administration Building, Carnegie Institution of Washington, Washington, D.C.

== See also ==
- Administrative centre, an administrative office of government, often regional
- Main Building (disambiguation)
- Old Main, also used similarly for main buildings of universities
