= West Virginia University Institute of Technology =

Public college in Beckley, West Virginia, US

- Former names: Montgomery Preparatory School (1895–1917); West Virginia Trade School (1917–1921); New River State School (1921–1931); New River State College (1931–1941); West Virginia Institute of Technology (1941–1996)
- Type: Public college
- Established: 1895; 131 years ago
- Parent institution: West Virginia University
- Campus President: T. Ramon Stuart
- Faculty: 177 total (120 full time) (57 part-time)
- Students: 1,622
- Location: Beckley, West Virginia, U.S. 37°46′34″N 81°11′03″W
- Campus: Rural, 200 acres (81 ha)
- Colors: Gold & Navy Blue
- Nickname: Golden Bears
- Sporting affiliations: NAIA – River States
- Mascot: Monty
- Website: www.wvutech.edu

West Virginia University Institute of Technology (WVU Tech, WVIT, WVU Beckley, or West Virginia Tech) is a public college in Beckley, West Virginia. It is a divisional campus of West Virginia University.

== History ==
The college was founded in 1895 in Montgomery, West Virginia as the sub-collegiate Montgomery Preparatory School for West Virginia University. In 1917, it was separated from WVU and renamed the West Virginia Trade School. Next, in 1921, it reached the junior college level as the New River State School. It became a four-year college as New River State College in 1931 and was renamed the West Virginia Institute of Technology in 1941. It began to grant engineering degrees in 1952.

West Virginia Tech added a community college in 1966. It began granting the master's degree in engineering in 1978, but no longer offers graduate degrees. WVU Tech's community college component was separated from WVU Tech in 2004 and WVU Tech is now part of West Virginia University.

The school became a regional campus of West Virginia University in 1996, leading to its present name. It later became an integrated division of WVU in July 2007. While several support departments on campus report directly to WVU, local oversight of academic programs remains on the WVU Tech campus.

=== 2011 revitalization efforts ===
The school had been beset with declining enrollments for many years. In 2011, the state government passed the WVU Tech Revitalization Project law, in response to its declining enrollments and financial distress. As a condition of the law, an assessment was conducted over the summer of 2011 and a “revitalization report” was completed by October 2011. The report identified a number of specific actions that needed to be taken, culminating in a revitalization of the university's administrative staff, and ultimately a move of the entire campus to the larger city of Beckley, West Virginia (see next section).

=== 2015 move to Beckley ===
In January 2015, WVU completed purchase of the buildings in Beckley formerly used by Mountain State University, which is about 30 miles from the Montgomery campus. WVU President E. Gordon Gee stated that Tech's future was "very secure" but refused to answer a question from the Charleston Daily Mail about the possibility of the school relocating.

On August 31, 2015, it was announced that Gee had recommended that WVU Tech move from Montgomery to the former MSU campus in Beckley, a larger and more accessible city. The university's Board of Governors unanimously approved this recommendation at its September 1 meeting. For the 2016–2017 academic years, freshman courses were taught at the Beckley campus, and all other courses remained in Montgomery. Summer classes in 2017 were mostly held online with all academic programs, administrative offices and athletic teams moving to Beckley in the Fall 2017.

Since the move, enrollment has increased from 1,106 students in 2017 to 1,622 in Spring of 2019, and the university has been ranked the best return-on-investment in the state of West Virginia.

=== Former Montgomery campus ===
The "Old Main" building was listed on the National Register of Historic Places in 1980.

The Neal D. Baisi Athletic Center was completed in 1968 and was home to the Golden Bears' basketball teams.

On April 21, 2017, it was announced that the buildings on the Fayette County side of the Montgomery campus would be lease-purchased by KVC Health Systems, a foster care and adoption services provider, for conversion into a proposed "transitional college for persons aging out of foster care", while the buildings on the Kanawha County side would be transferred to BridgeValley Community & Technical College. The only exceptions are the "Tech Marina" (a boat dock) and the David S. Long Alumni Center, which were transferred to the city of Montgomery, and the HiRise Residence Hall, which was demolished on June 4, 2017. However, the KVC effort was abandoned in 2019 and the buildings are currently listed as surplus property and unused.

== Campus ==
The Beckley campus sits on 170 acres in downtown Beckley, West Virginia and has twenty eight buildings.

=== Campus Safety ===
The university uses the WVU Alert system, a text and email notification that can send urgent news to students, parents, faculty and staff. This system notifies for emergency which includes acts of violence, hazardous material incidents; and weather alerts that may cause campus delays or campus closures. WVU Tech also uses the LiveSafe app, a smart phone application that allows its users to report safety concerns or potential threats. The app also includes a feature that allows its users to invite a friend to know your real-time location while they go on a walk.

==== WVU Tech Campus Police ====
The university's campus police are a subset of the West Virginia University Police for which they provide patrol-protection all WVU Tech campus property, students, faculty and staff. The university currently employs eight state certified and sworn police officers for which their authority granted to them are found in W. Va. Code § 18B-4-5.

== Academics ==
Undergraduate demographics as of Fall 2023
Race and ethnicity	Total
White	77%
International student	10%
Two or more races	4%
Black	3%
Hispanic	3%
Asian	1%
Unknown	1%
Economic diversity
Low-income (Note: The percentage of students who received an income-based federal Pell grant intended for low-income students.)	37%
Affluent (Note: The percentage of students who are a part of the American middle class at the bare minimum.)	63%

The college offers 20 baccalaureate and one associates degree programs spread between four academic schools (the Leonard C. Nelson School of Engineering, the School of Arts and Sciences, the School of Business, and WVU School of Nursing - Beckley Campus).

WVU Tech is accredited through West Virginia University's accreditation with the Higher Learning Commission. All five of WVU Tech's engineering programs and its computer science program are accredited by ABET.

== Athletics ==
The West Virginia Tech (WVU Tech) athletic teams are called the Golden Bears. The university is a member of the National Association of Intercollegiate Athletics (NAIA), primarily competing in the River States Conference (RSC) since the 2015–16 academic year. The Golden Bears previously competed as an Independent within the Association of Independent Institutions (AII) from 2012–13 to 2014–15; and in the Mid-South Conference (MSC) from 2006–07 to 2011–12.

WVU Tech historically competed in the West Virginia Intercollegiate Athletic Conference (WVIAC), which is currently affiliated with the NCAA Division II ranks, with the other small colleges in the state from its inception in 1924–25 until the end of the 2005–06 school year, when it could no longer maintain that level of competition. They also competed as a member of the United States Collegiate Athletic Association (USCAA) from 2012–13 to 2015–16.

WVU Tech competes in 17 intercollegiate varsity sports: Men's sports include baseball, basketball, cross country, golf, soccer, swimming, track & field and wrestling; while women's sports include basketball, cross country, soccer, softball, swimming, track & field and volleyball; and co-ed sports include cheerleading and eSports. Former sports were football, which it was dropped as a result of the Revitalization Study after 2011.

=== Accomplishments ===
The sports at WVU Tech have been very successful over the years. The men's basketball team has won the WVIAC and has been successful in the Mid-South Conference. They were runners-up in the AII Tournament in 2013. They have also been to the NAIA Nationals over the years. The women's basketball team won the AII Championship in 2013 and went to the NAIA National Championships that year.

The men's soccer team won the USCAA National Championship in 2013 and 2014. They also were runners-up in the USCAA National Championship in 2012.

== Notable alumni ==
- Chuck Banks - football player
- Mike Barrett - basketball player
- Charles E. Bayless - businessman and educational administrator
- Squire Parsons - Christian music soloist and baritone
- Sedale Threatt - basketball player
- Calvin Wallace - football player
- Larry Pack - 26th Treasurer of West Virginia
- Ethel Caffie-Austin - American gospel musician
