= KVC =

KVC may refer to:

- K13VC, a defunct independent television station in Austin, Texas, United States known on-air as "KVC TV 13"
- Kankakee Valley Conference, a high school athletics conference in Indiana, United States
- Karl Video Corporation, a former distribution company of home media acquired by Lorimar Television (now part of Warner Bros. Home Entertainment)
- King Cove Airport (IATA code: KVC), Alaska, United States
- King Videocable, an American broadcast cable television company
- Kloss Video Corporation, a subsidiary of Advent Corporation
- Komodo vs. Cobra, a 2005 American television film
- KVC Health Systems, an American non-profit child welfare and behavioural healthcare organization

== See also ==
- K.V.C. Westerlo, a Belgian football club
