= South Jersey Gas, Electric and Traction Company Office Building =

- U.S. National Register of Historic Places
- New Jersey Register of Historic Places
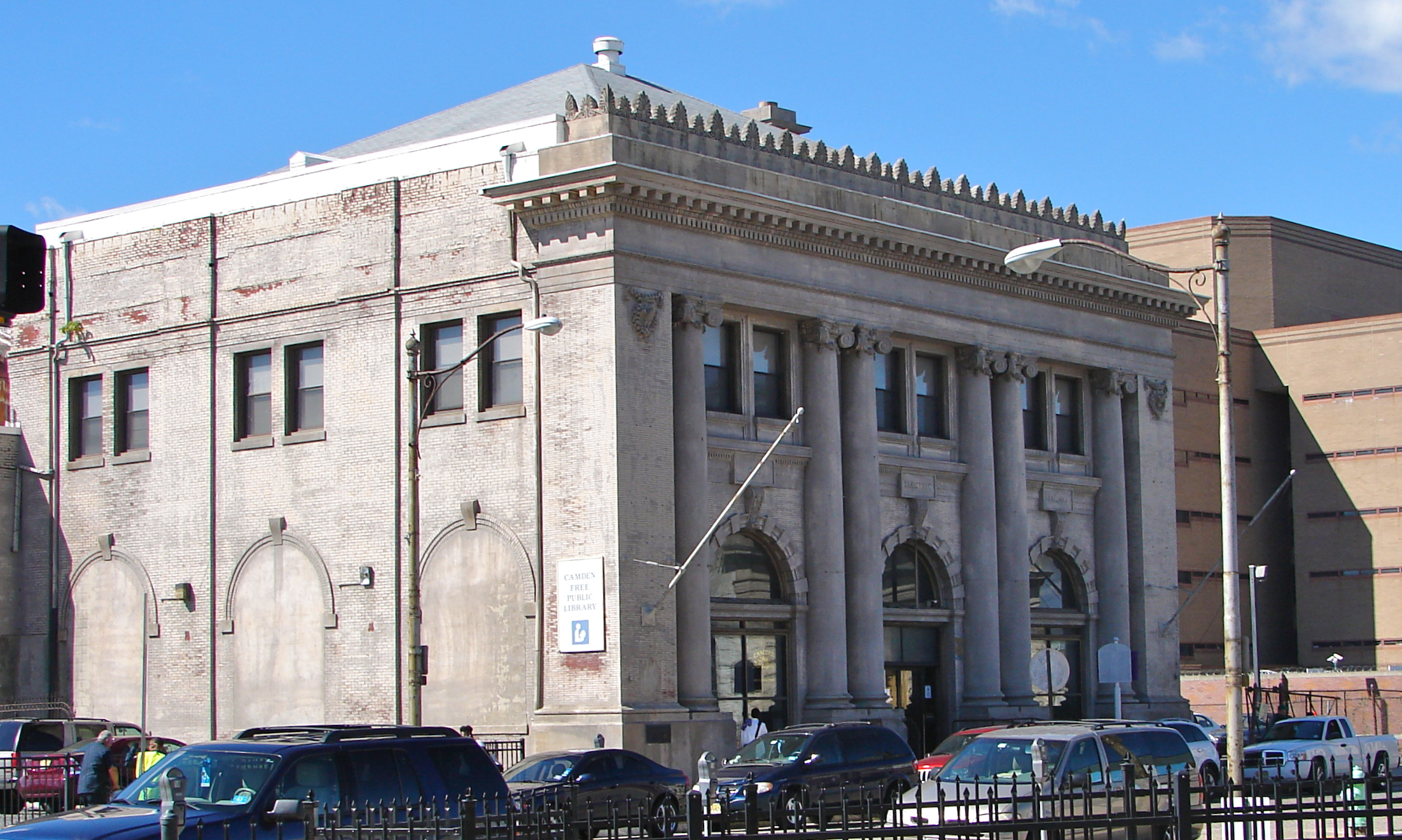

- Location within Camden County, New Jersey Location within New Jersey Location within the United States
- Location: 418 Federal Street, Camden, New Jersey
- Coordinates: 39°56′51″N 75°7′16″W
- Area: 0.4 acres (0.16 ha)
- Built: 1901
- Architect: Stephen, Thomas
- Architectural style: Beaux Arts
- NRHP reference No.: 04001436
- NJRHP No.: 4362

Significant dates
- Added to NRHP: January 5, 2005
- Designated NJRHP: November 8, 2004

South Jersey Gas, Electric and Traction Company Office Building is located in Camden, Camden County, New Jersey, United States. The building was built in 1901 and was added to the National Register of Historic Places on January 5, 2005.

The building served as the main branch of the Camden Free Public Library after it relocated from the former Camden Free Public Library Main Building, but was closed in 2011.

== See also ==
- Cooper Library in Johnson Park
- National Register of Historic Places listings in Camden County, New Jersey
