= Agecroft Hall =

Manor house in Virginia, United States

- Agecroft
- U.S. National Register of Historic Places
- Virginia Landmarks Register
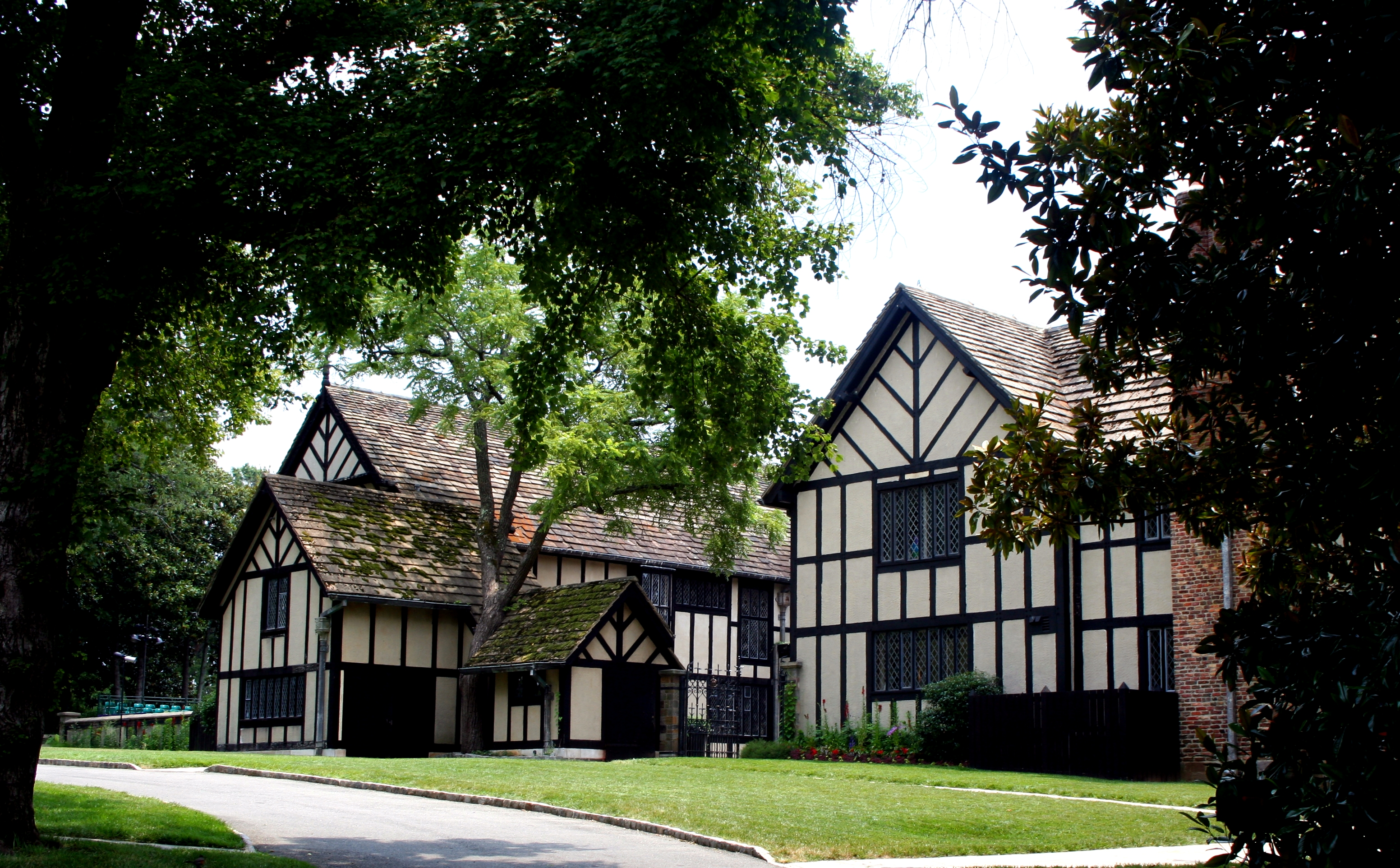

- Location within Virginia Location within the United States
- Interactive map showing the location of Agecroft Hall
- Location: 4305 Sulgrave Road, Richmond, Virginia
- Coordinates: 37°33′10″N 77°30′23″W
- Area: 23.1 acres (9.3 ha)
- Built: 1926
- Architect: Henry G. Morse (restoration); Charles Gillette (landscape)
- Architectural style: Tudor-Tudor Revival
- NRHP reference No.: 78003186
- VLR No.: 127-0223

Significant dates
- Added to NRHP: 13 December 1978
- Designated VLR: 18 July 1978

Agecroft Hall is a Tudor manor house and estate located at 4305 Sulgrave Road on the James River in the Windsor Farms neighborhood of Richmond, Virginia, United States. The manor house was built in the late 15th century, and was originally located in the Irwell Valley at Agecroft, Pendlebury, then in the historic county of Lancashire, England, but by the 20th century it was unoccupied and in a state of disrepair.

Thomas C. Williams Jr. of Richmond, Virginia, a wealthy entrepreneur, purchased Agecroft Hall upon the advice of his architect, Henry G. Morse. During the Country Place Era, when many wealthy American families were building extensive country estates emulating those they had seen in Europe, Williams, whose business interests included tobacco, banking, and shipping, wished to build a true English manor house on his 23-acre estate overlooking the James River. Agecroft was dismantled, crated, transported across the Atlantic, and reconstructed in Richmond's Windsor Farms neighborhood – then a fashionable new neighborhood being developed by Williams on his family farm site, which had long been known as "Windsor".

The architect, Morse, was retained to oversee the reconstruction. The intention was not to replicate Agecroft as it had stood in Lancashire, but rather to create a functional and comfortable mansion reminiscent of its English predecessor. The original floor plan was abandoned and many 20th century conveniences were included. Reconstruction took two years and cost approximately $250,000, and the project was completed during the spring of 1928.

Williams died the following year, having stipulated in his will that upon his widow's death or relocation, Agecroft Hall would become a house museum.

== History ==
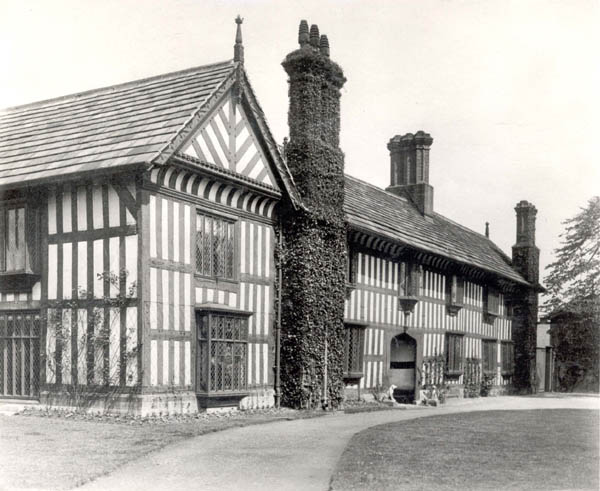
The original Agecroft Hall in Pendlebury, Lancashire.

The hall was one of three manor houses owned by the Prestwich family from 1292 when Edmund Crouchback, Earl of Lancaster, granted land on the banks of the River Irwell in Lancashire to Adam de Prestwich. In 1350, Johanna de Tetlow, daughter of Alice de Prestwich and Jordan de Tetlow, married Richard de Langley of Middleton after the deaths of her parents and brothers – possibly from the plague. The name "Agecroft", meaning "field of wild celery" (from ache and croft) was adopted circa 1376, the old name of Pendlebury being dropped for the manor but not for the village. Subsequently, the Langleys lived at Agecroft Hall until 1561 when the male line failed. The Langleys were a powerful local family for several centuries with major land holdings across the area.

Robert Langley was the last male heir of the Langleys. The first Robert Langley (1379–1446) was a ward of John of Gaunt and later supported the claim of Gaunt's son as Henry IV in the overthrow of King Richard II. The second Robert Langley (1462–1547) supported Henry VII and received a lifetime annuity from him. And yet another Robert Langley (1506–1561) was granted a knighthood by Edward VI and later received a general pardon from Queen Elizabeth. By this time the Langleys were very prosperous and had intermarried with all the great Lancashire families. But Sir Robert and his wife Cecily de Trafford had no son and on his death the property was divided equally between his four daughters. Dorothy, the eldest, married James Assheton from Chadderton. Margaret married John Reddish of Reddish. Catherine married Thomas Legh, a younger son of Sir Piers Legh of Lyme. Anne, his third daughter inherited Agecroft Hall as part of her portion and subsequently married William Dauntesey.

Richard Langley's brother, William (1315–1386) was Rector of Middleton. Another brother was the grandfather of Bishop Thomas Langley who entered the service of John of Gaunt and became Lord Chancellor of England, Keeper of the Privy Seal and Bishop of Durham. He was also elected a Cardinal, but refused the appointment. Bishop Thomas paid for the rebuilding of St Leonard's Church, Middleton, which was reconsecrated in 1412.

In the 1662 Hearth Tax returns, Agecroft Hall was recorded as having 11 hearths out of a total of 35 in the whole of Pendlebury.

At the end of the 19th century, industrialisation swept through the Irwell Valley. Coal pits were opened all around Agecroft Hall, railway tracks were cut across the manor and mining subsidence above the Clifton Hall Colliery made a dirty lake on the edge of the estate. The house fell into disrepair and was sold at auction in 1925 to Mr & Mrs Thomas C. Williams. Today, Agecroft Hall stands re-created on the banks of the James River, in a setting chosen to be reminiscent of its original site at Agecroft near the River Irwell. Agecroft's grounds reflect English gardens with Elizabethan aromatics and were designed by Charles Gillette.

== Babes in the Wood ==
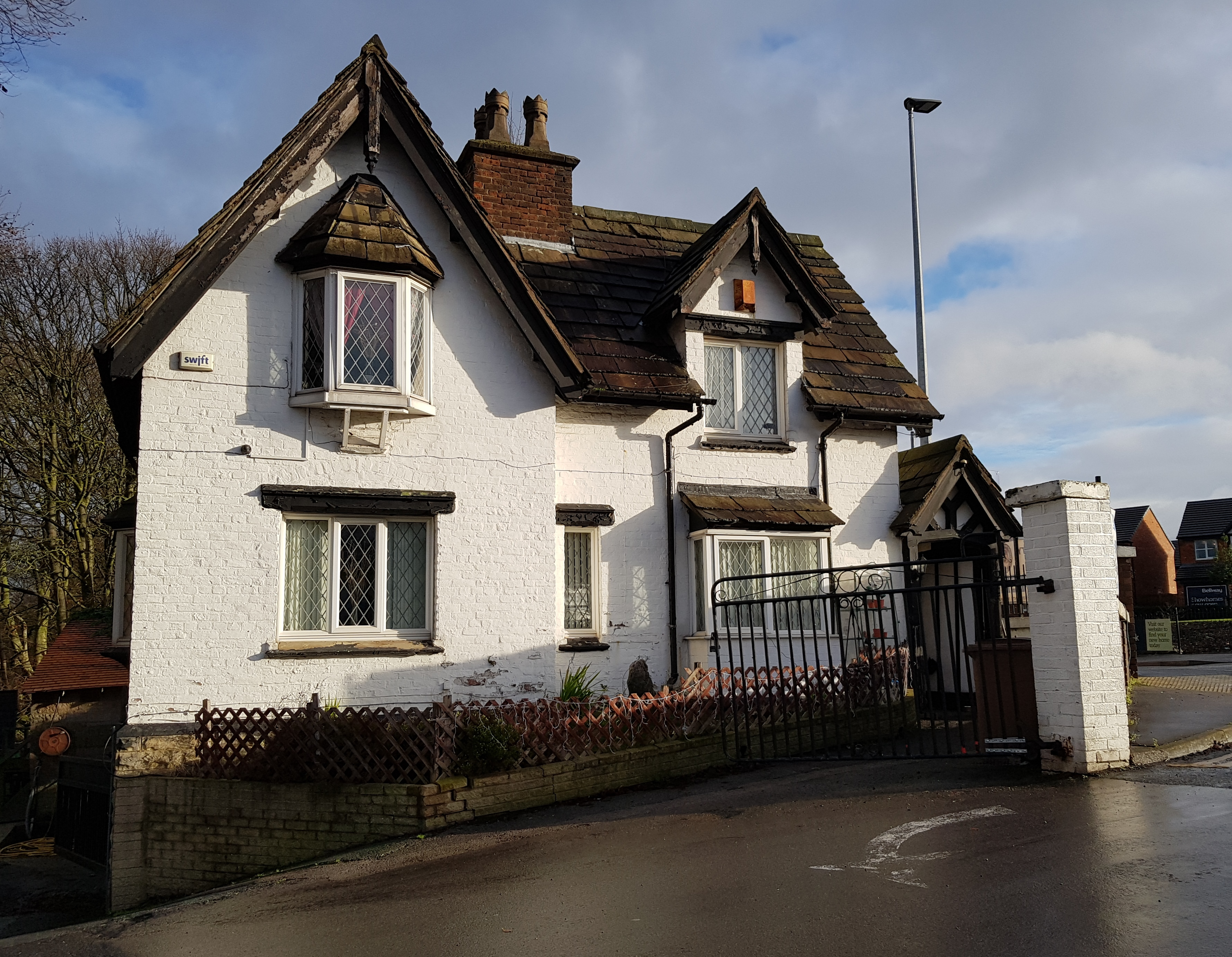
The gatehouse, or lodge, is all that remains of the Agecroft Estate in the UK

Cyril Bracegidle in his book Dark River: Irwell asserts that legend has it that the tale of the Babes in the Wood was inspired by an incident at the hall during the reign of Edward III. On the morning of the Feast of the Ascension (the 40th Day after Easter Sunday) in 1374, young Roger Langley and his sister escaped from the villainous Robert de Holland and his men and hid in the forest which covered the slopes of the Irwell Valley, cared for by loyal retainers, until their guardian, John of Gaunt, the first Duke of Lancaster, rescued them. However, other sources attribute the story to an incident in Wayland Wood, Norfolk.

== Gallery ==
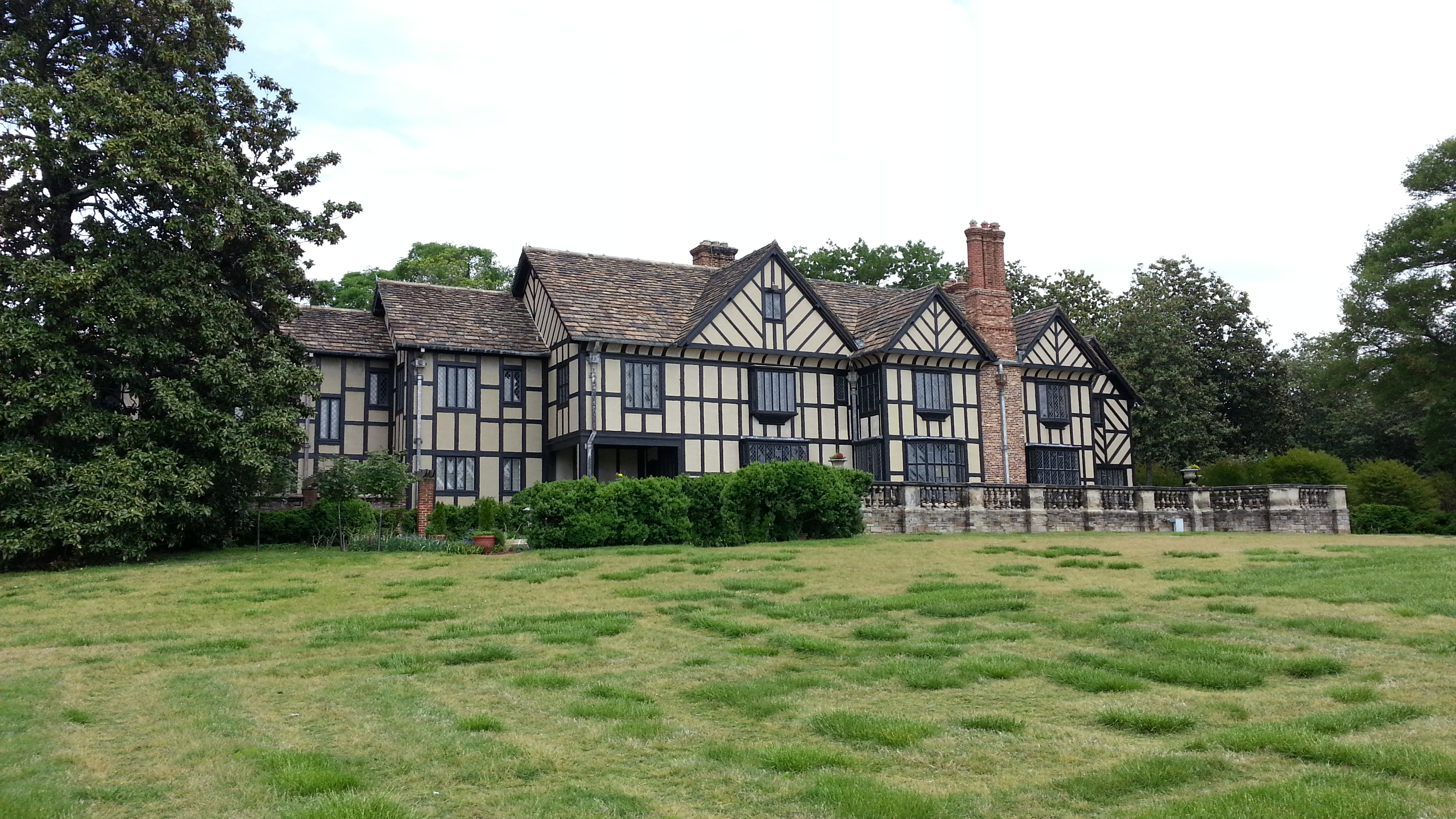
Rear view

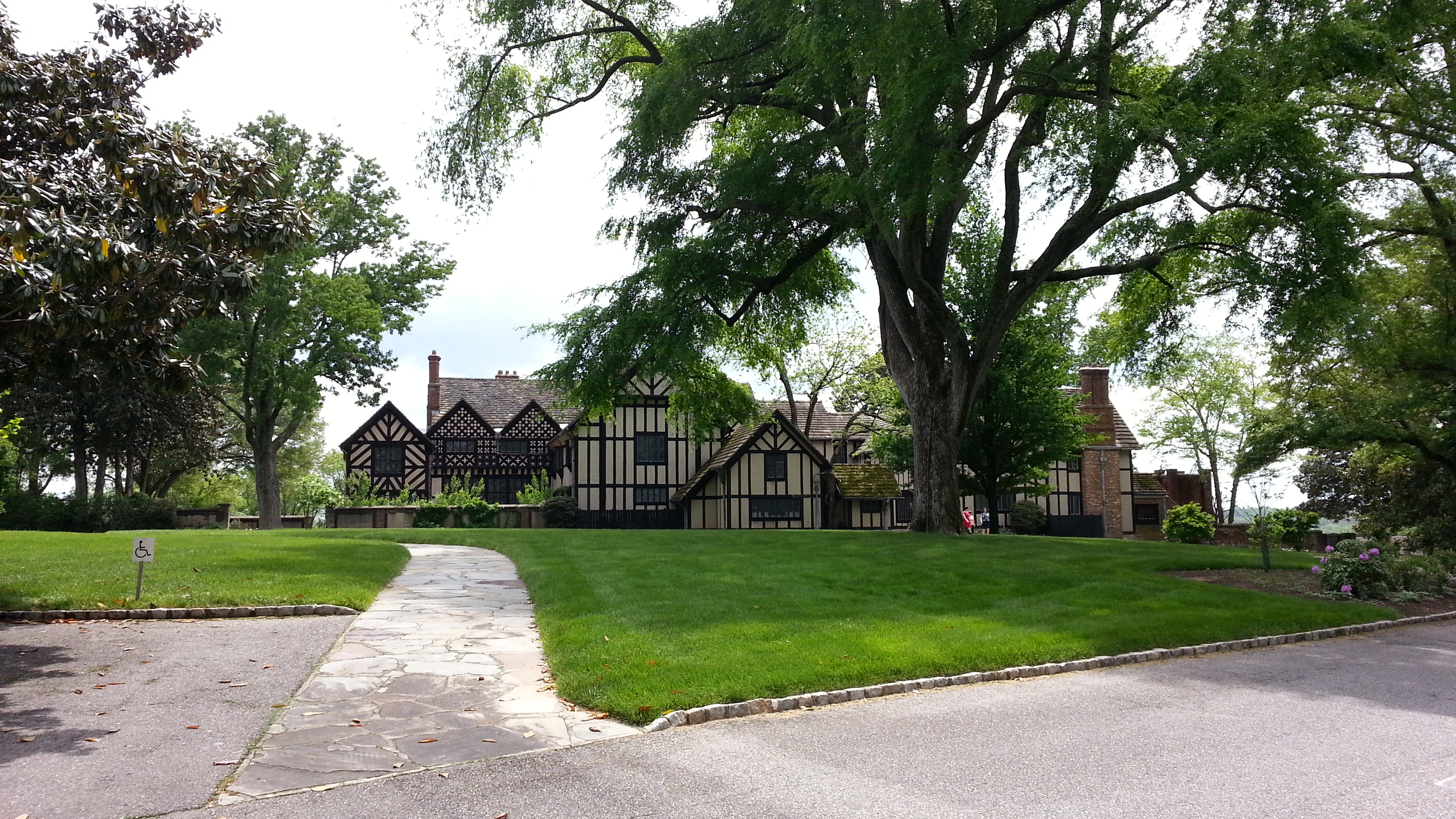
Front entrance

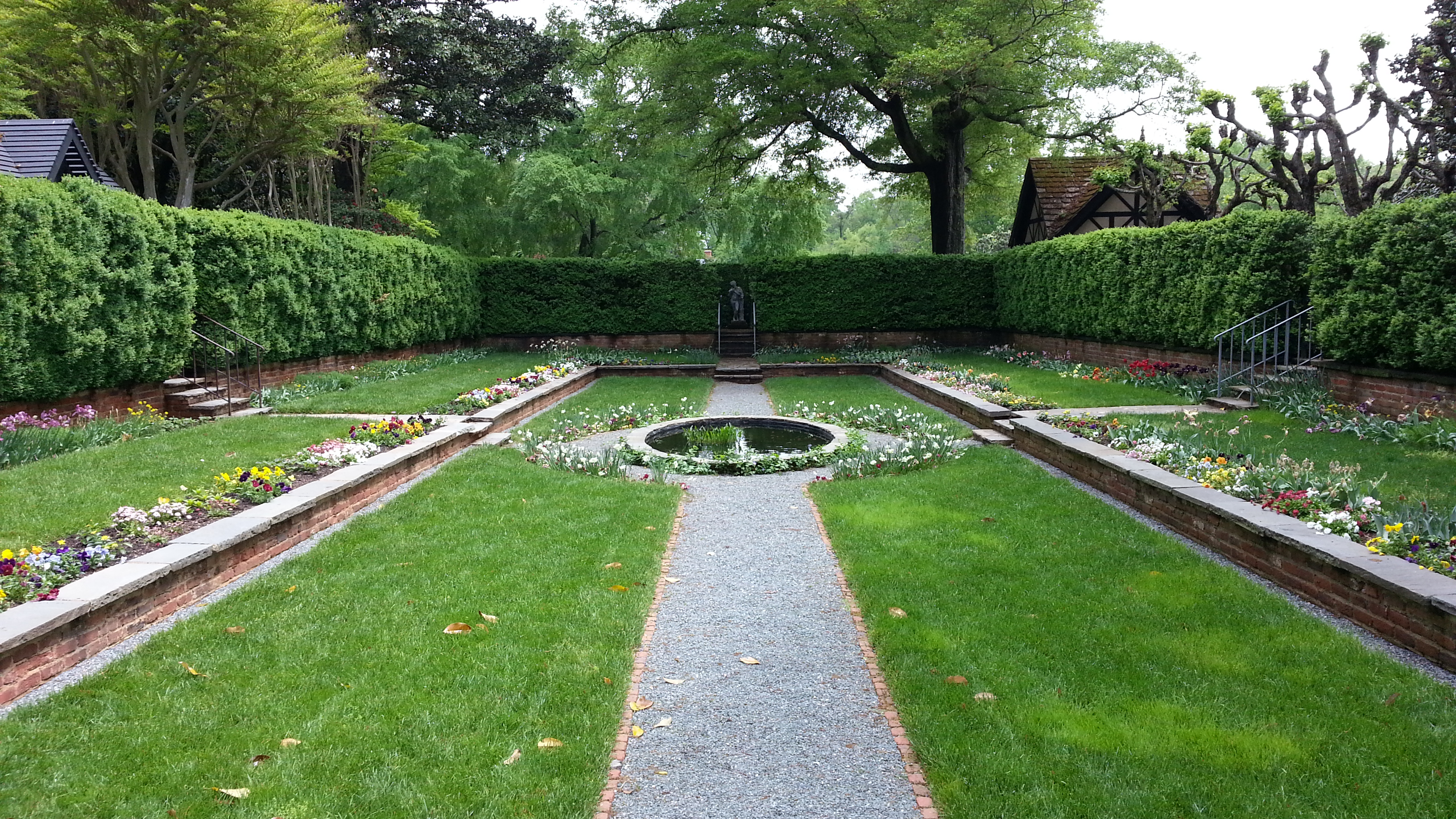
Sunken garden

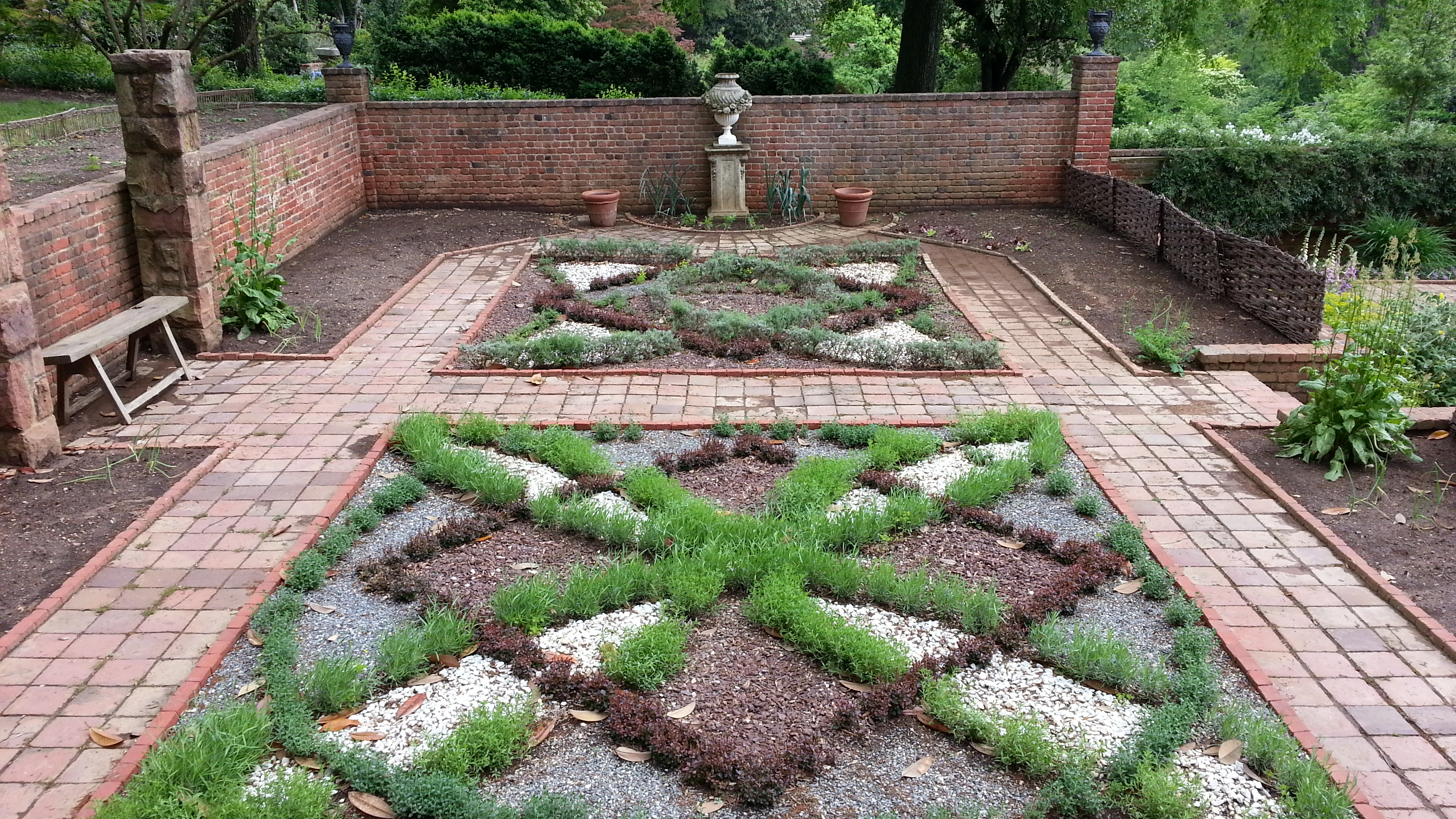
Elizabethan knot garden

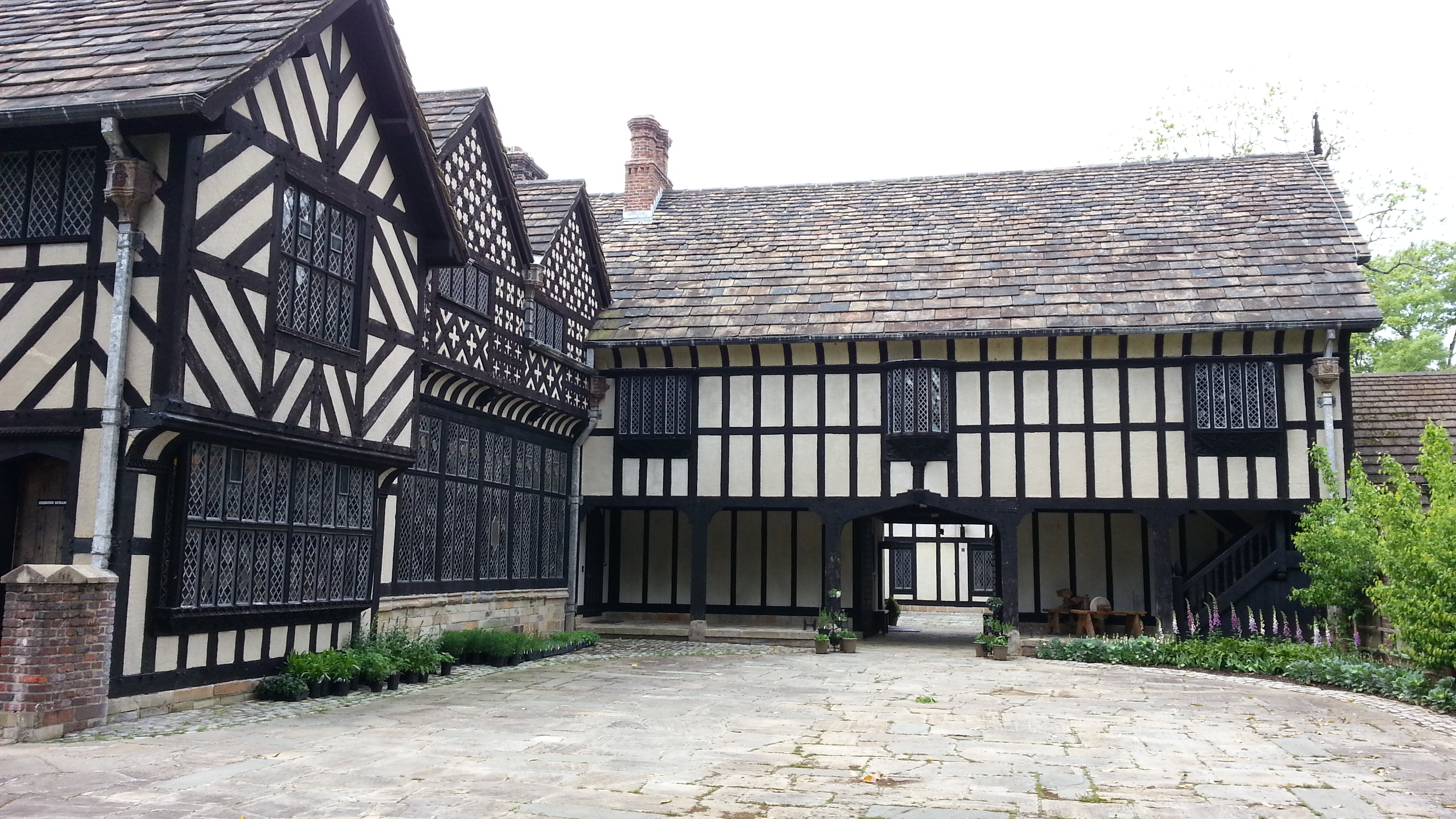
Courtyard

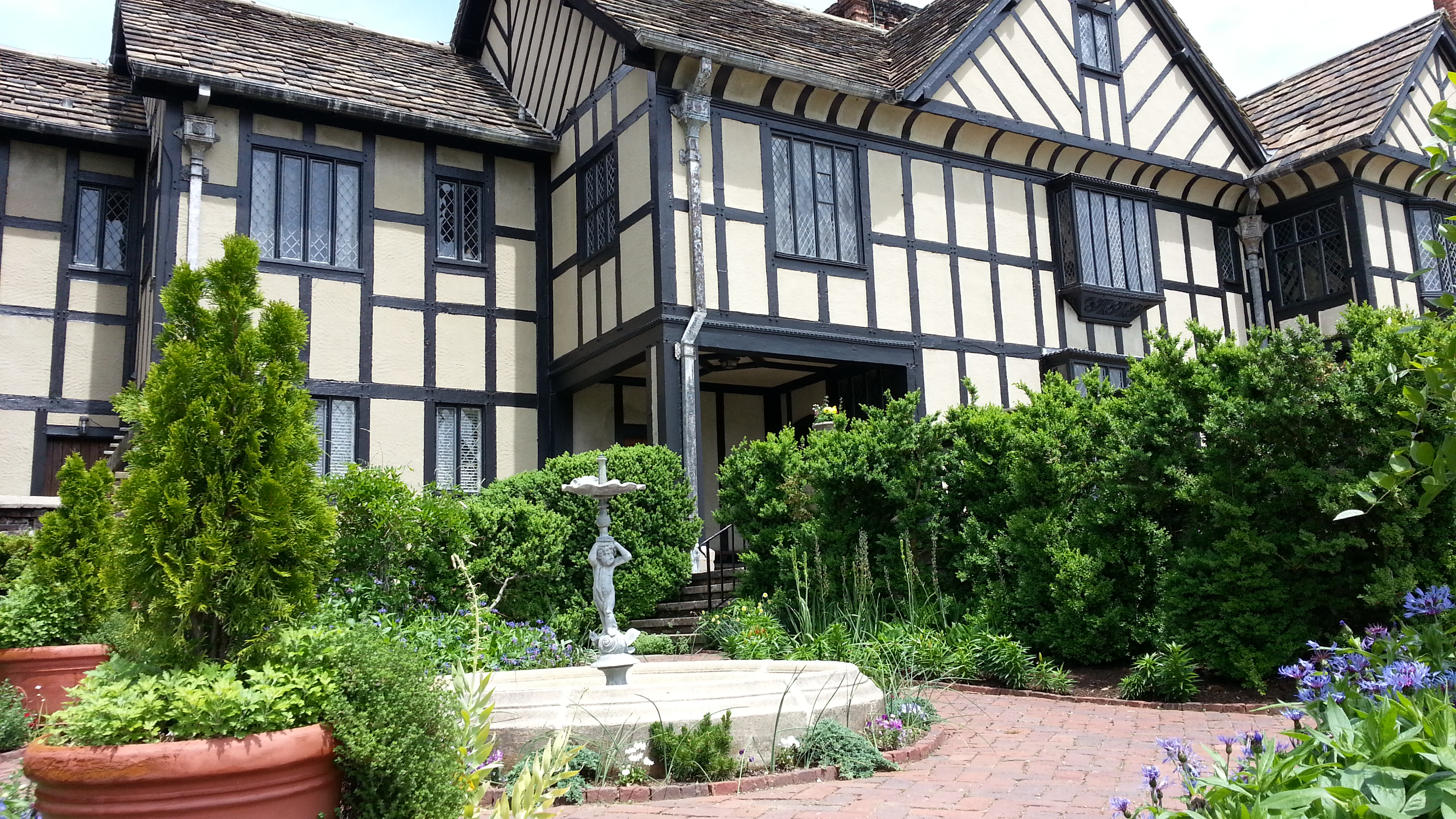
Rear fountain

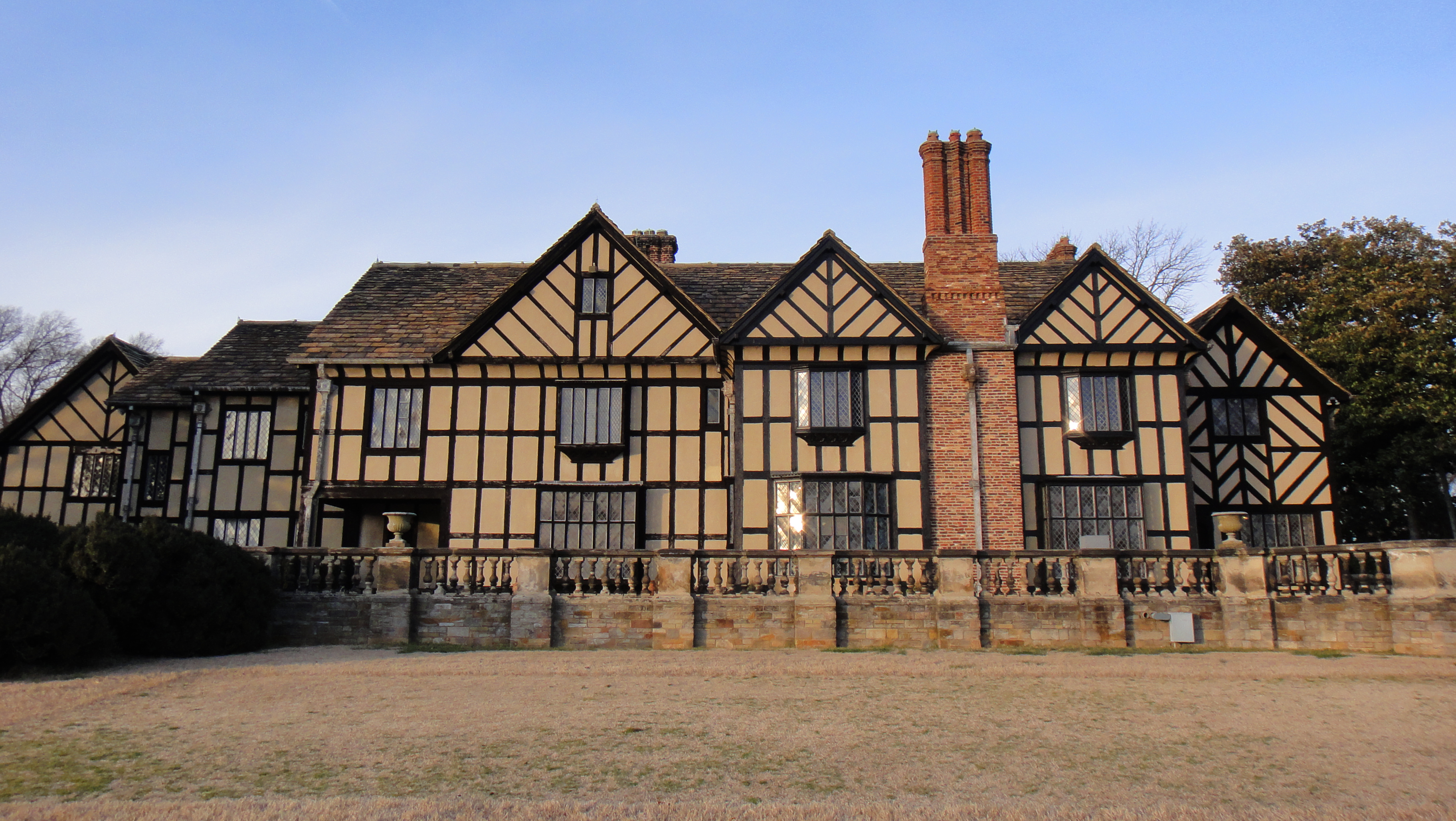
Rear

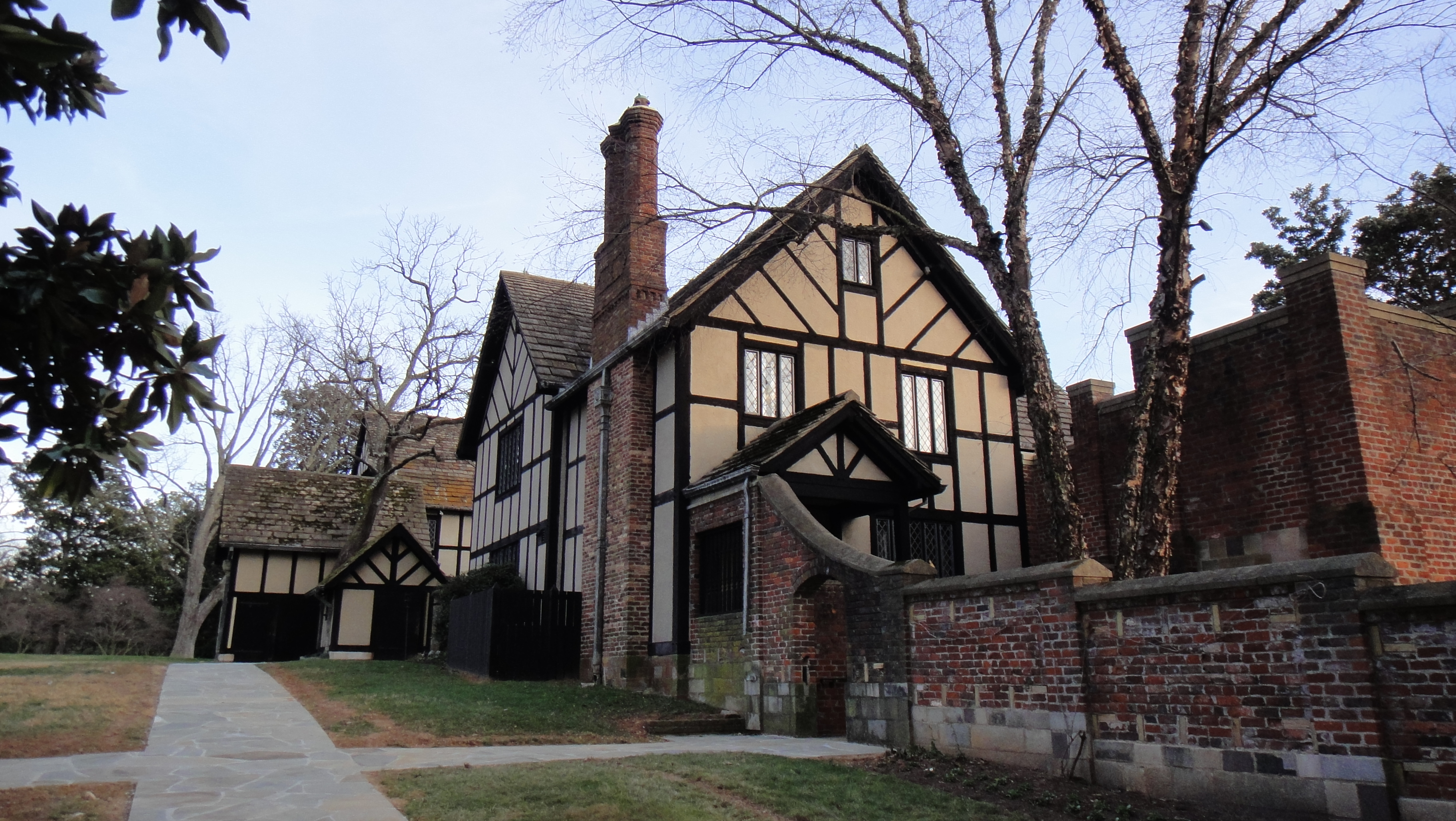
Side entrance

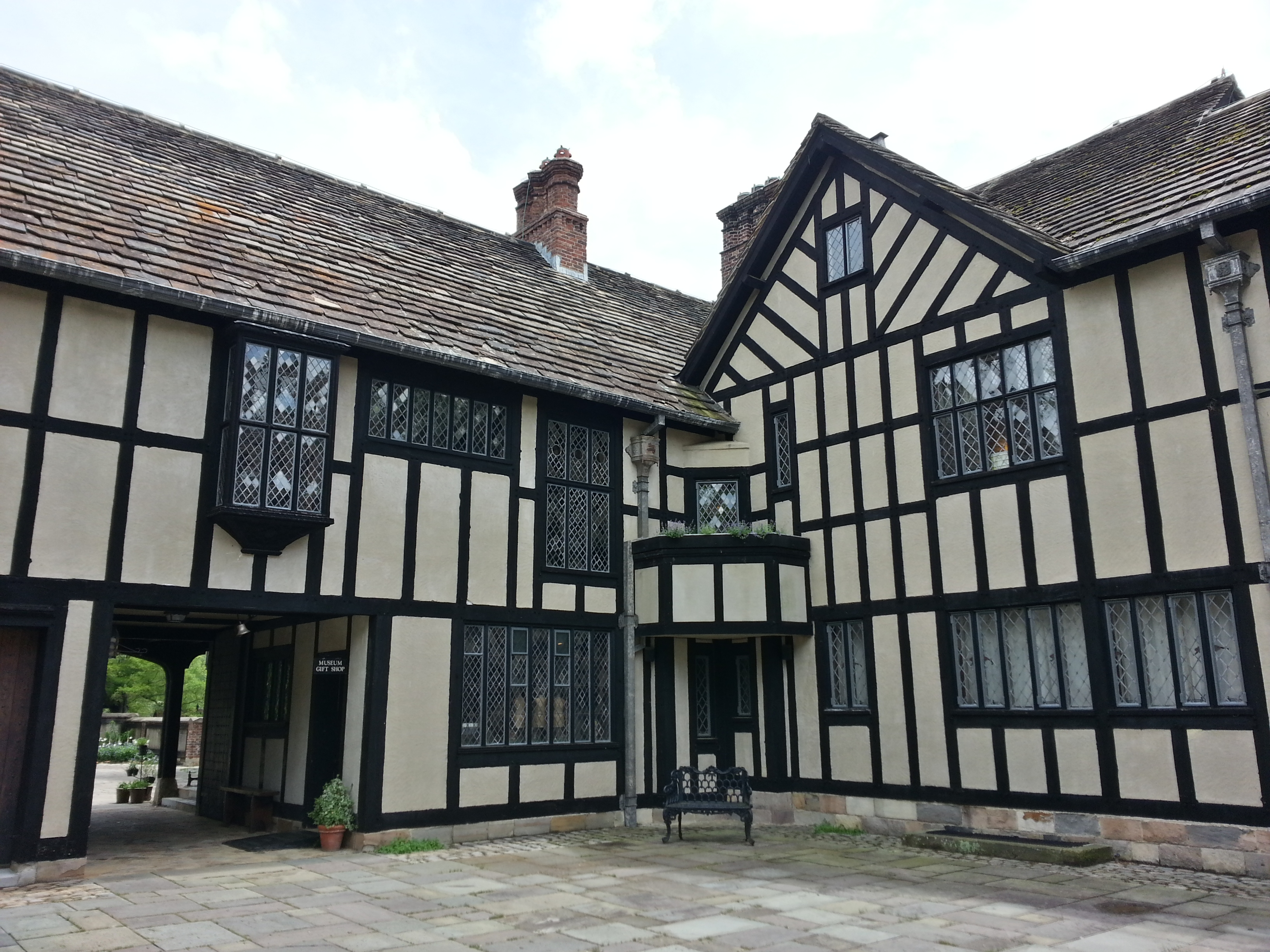
Entrance courtyard

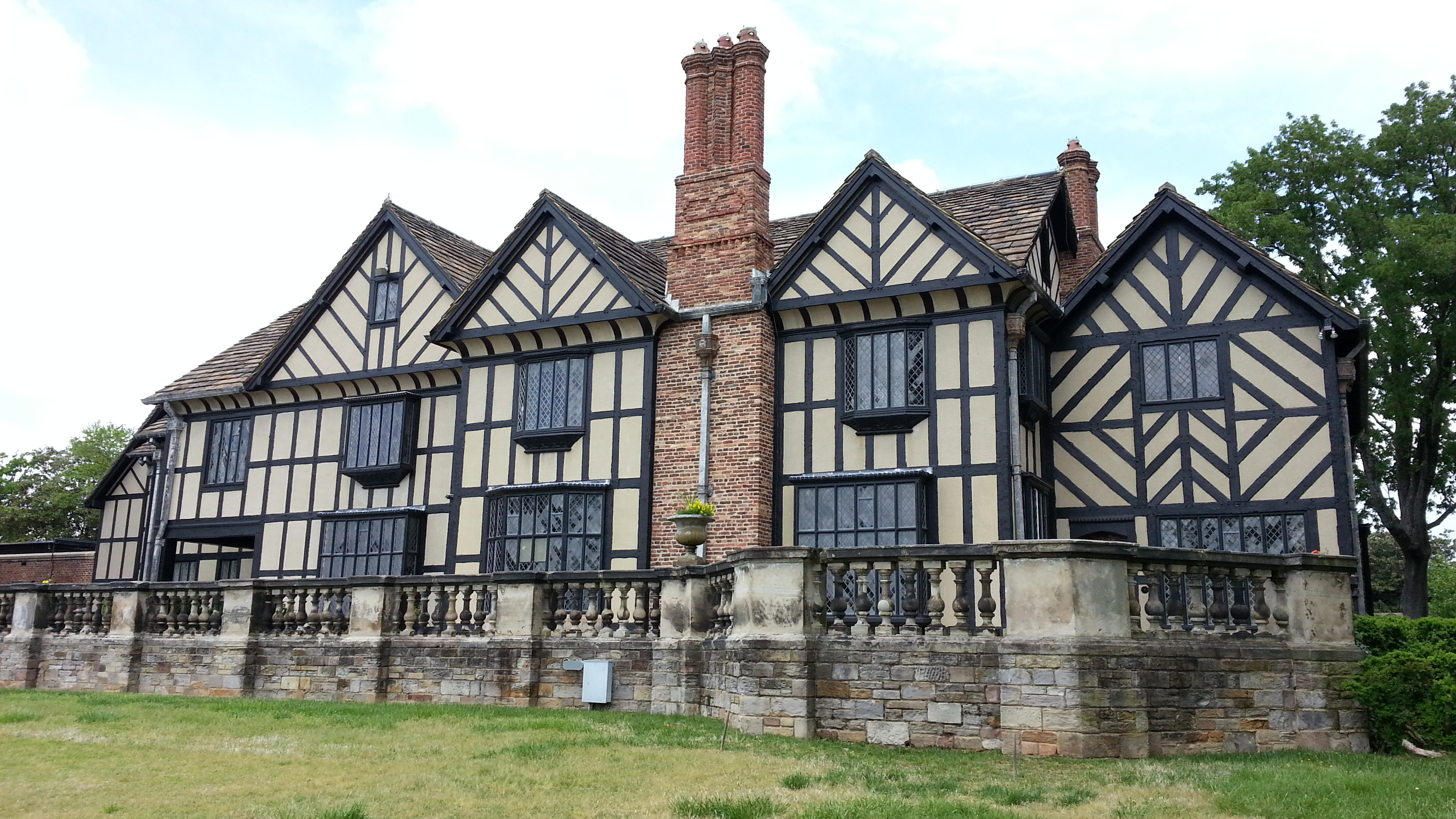
Rear facade

== See also ==
- Virginia House, a neighboring building also moved from England.
- National Register of Historic Places listings in Richmond, Virginia
