= Henry G. Morse =

American architect

Henry Grant Morse, Jr. (1884 – May 28, 1934) was an American architect, best known for the two English manor houses that he relocated to Richmond, Virginia.

== Early life ==
He was born in Canton, Ohio to Mary K. and Henry G. Morse, Sr.

He studied at the Episcopal Academy near Philadelphia. He then enrolled in the Massachusetts Institute of Technology where he studied architecture. While there, he was a member of the fraternity of Delta Psi (aka St. Anthony Hall).

== Career ==
He established himself in Manhattan, New York City before the age of 20. As an associate, he collaborated with Boston architect Herbert D. Hale on the Camden Free Public Library Main Building (1903–05) in Camden, New Jersey; the Norfolk Public Library (1903–06) in Norfolk, Virginia; and the United Engineering Societies Building (1904–07) in New York City. These were all projects funded by Andrew Carnegie.

As associates, Hale and Morse both collaborated with architects Parker & Thomas on the Baltimore & Ohio Railroad Building (1904–06) in Baltimore, Maryland. While working in Camden and Baltimore, the pair kept an office in the Drexel Building in Philadelphia, Pennsylvania.

On his own, he designed a laboratory building at Yale University, and Tudor-style houses in New Rochelle, New York for mural artist Frederick Dana Marsh and cartoonist Clare Briggs.He worked as a partner in the firm of Hawes & Morse for a number of years. He designed a YMCA in Camden, New Jersey.

He was noted in particular for his work on Virginia House in Richmond, Virginia, which is partly a reconstruction of a Tudor manor shipped over from Warwickshire, England. Morse was hired in 1925 to visit England and study other manors, travelling around the English countryside and surveying properties such as Wormleighton Manor, fusing together different ideas into the final reconstruction in Virginia. He also supervised the relocation of Agecroft Hall, which was re-erected next door to Virginia House, 1925–29.

== Personal life ==
He died on May 28, 1934, at his home in Essex Fells, New Jersey leaving behind his wife, Harriet K. Morse, author of 1939 gardening classic "Gardening in the Shade". Harriet also wrote for gardening magazines, the garden sections of the New York Times and other newspapers. Essex Fells, New Jersey.

== Selected works ==
- Camden Free Public Library Main Building (1903–05), 616 Broadway, Camden, New Jersey, with Herbert D. Hale, principal architect. The building is vacant and no longer used.
- Norfolk Public Library, (1903–06), 345 West Freemason Street, Norfolk, Virginia, with Herbert D. Hale, principal architect. The building is currently (July 2013) for sale.
- Baltimore & Ohio Railroad Building (1904–06), 2 North Charles Street in Baltimore, Maryland, with Herbert D. Hale, associate architect, and Parker & Thomas, principal architects. Now the Hotel Monaco Baltimore.
- United Engineering Societies Building (1904–07), 29-33 West 39th Street, Manhattan, New York City, with Herbert D. Hale, principal architect. Now the headquarters for Thor Equities.
- Dunham Laboratories (1912), Yale University, 10 Hillhouse Avenue, New Haven, Connecticut.
- Frederick Dana Marsh residence (1914), 56 Avon Road, Wykagyl Park, New Rochelle, New York.
- Clare Briggs residence (1917), 1 Byworth Road, Wykagyl Park, New Rochelle, New York.
- Agecroft Hall (relocated & rebuilt 1925–26), 4305 Sulgrave Road, Richmond, Virginia.
- Virginia House (relocated & rebuilt 1925–29), 4301 Sulgrave Road, Richmond, Virginia.
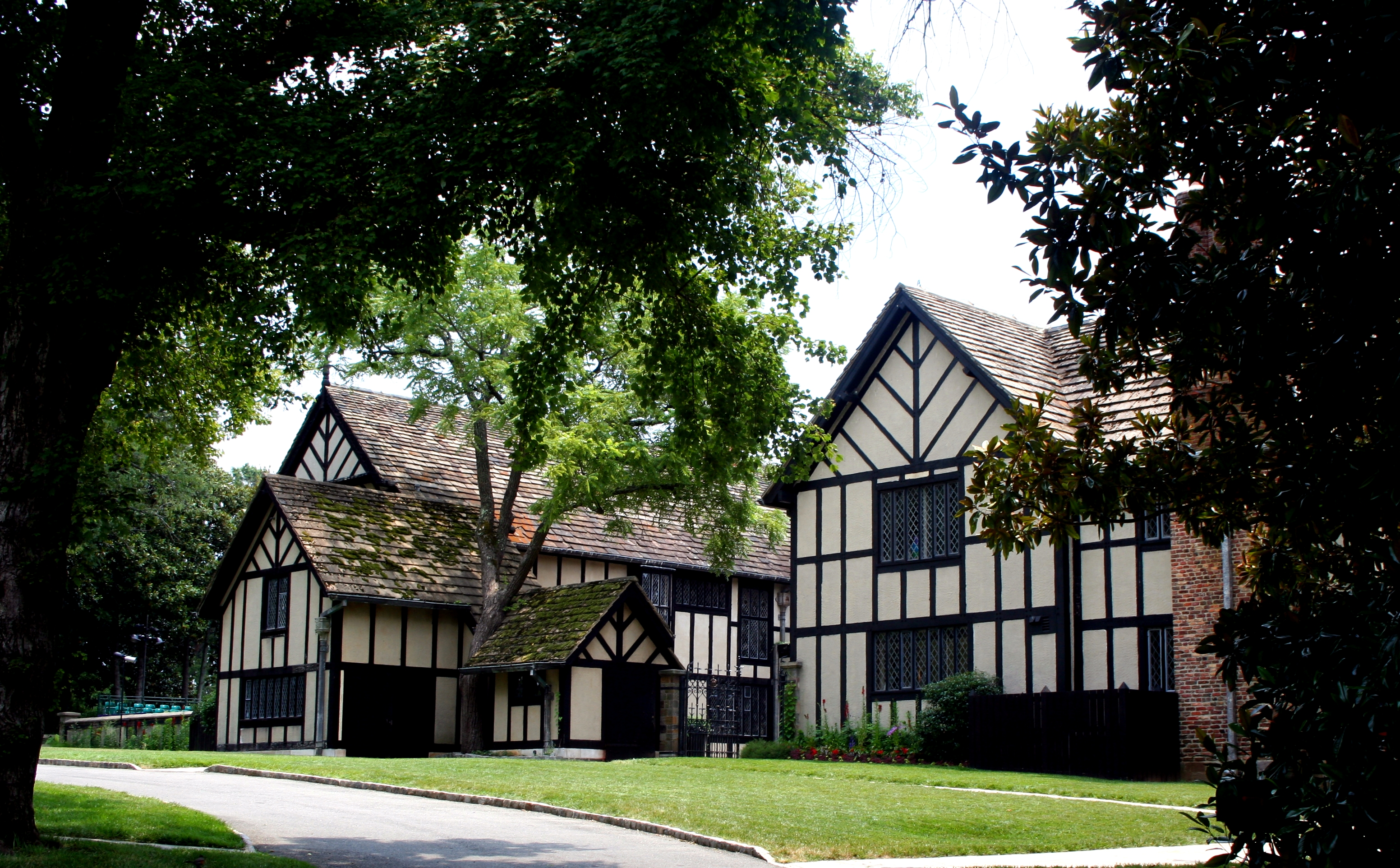
Agecroft Hall, relocated by Morse to Richmond, Virginia.
