= Administration Building (Portales, New Mexico) =

- U.S. National Register of Historic Places
- NM State Register of Cultural Properties
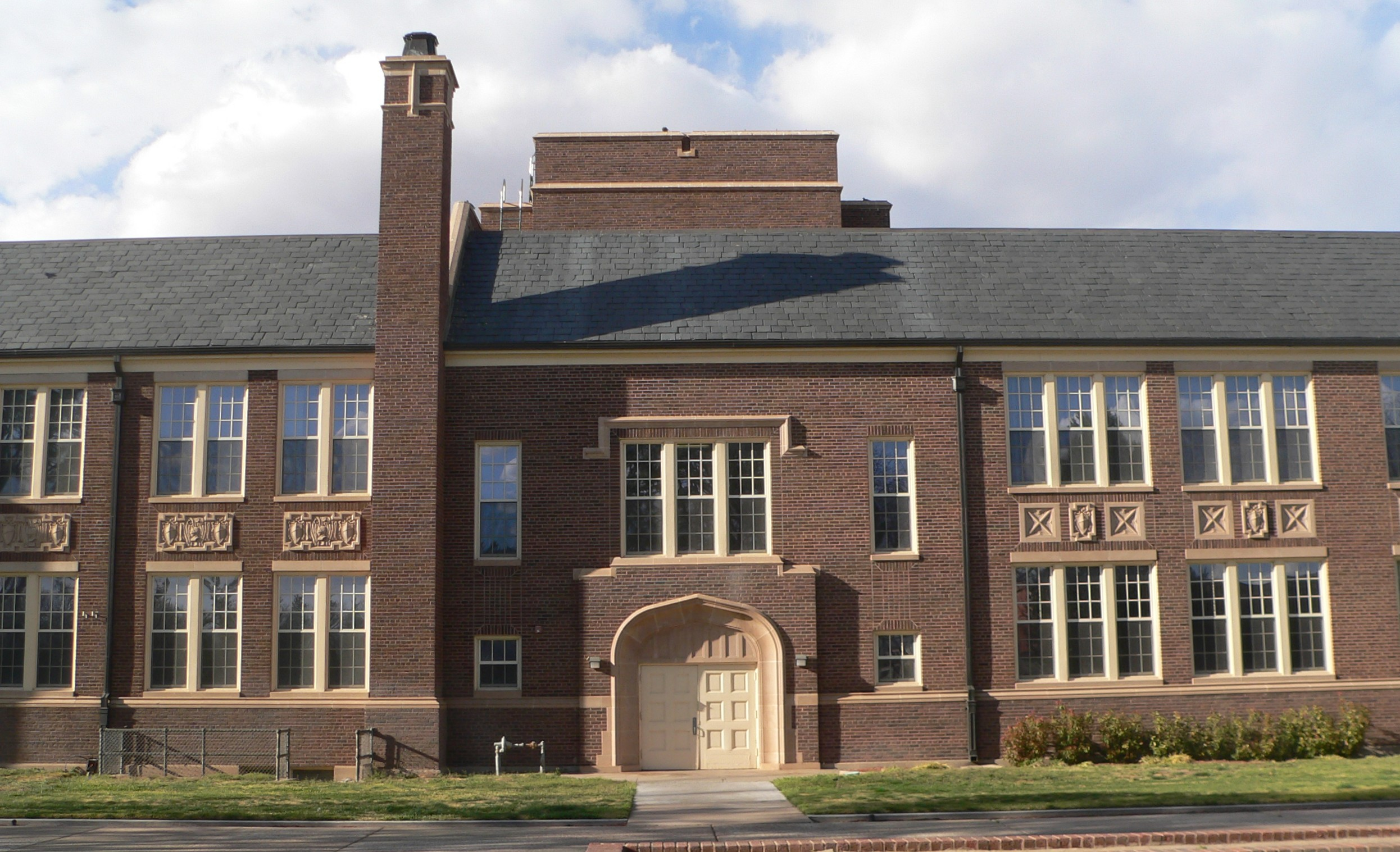

- Location within New Mexico Location within the United States
- Location: S side of University Pl. and campus green., ENMU, Portales, New Mexico
- Coordinates: 34°10′44″N 103°20′53″W
- Area: 0.5 acres (0.20 ha)
- Built: 1931
- Architect: Orville R. Walker
- Architectural style: Late Gothic Revival, Collegiate Gothic Revival
- MPS: New Mexico Campus Buildings Built 1906--1937 TR
- NRHP reference No.: 88001558
- NMSRCP No.: 1468

Significant dates
- Added to NRHP: September 22, 1988
- Designated NMSRCP: July 8, 1988

The Administration Building, on the south side of University Pl. and the campus green of Eastern New Mexico University, in Portales in Roosevelt County, New Mexico, was built in 1931. It was listed on the National Register of Historic Places in 1988.

It is registered with the New Mexico State Register of Cultural Properties (SRCP).

It is a three-story Collegiate Gothic building with a steep slate roof and pointed pedimented gable ends. It was designed by Lubbock, Texas architect Orville R. Walker. It was built in 1931 and extended in 1936. It was built to serve as an administration building and still did at time of NRHP nomination. It was the first building built on the new Eastern New Mexico University campus; in fact it was completed two years before classes began on the campus. The 1936 work was completed using Works Project Administration funds.

Subsequent buildings on the campus were also done in Collegiate Gothic style.
