= Aubrey K. Lucas Administration Building =

Building on the campus of the University of Southern Mississippi in the US

Coordinates: 31.32656°N 89.3327°W

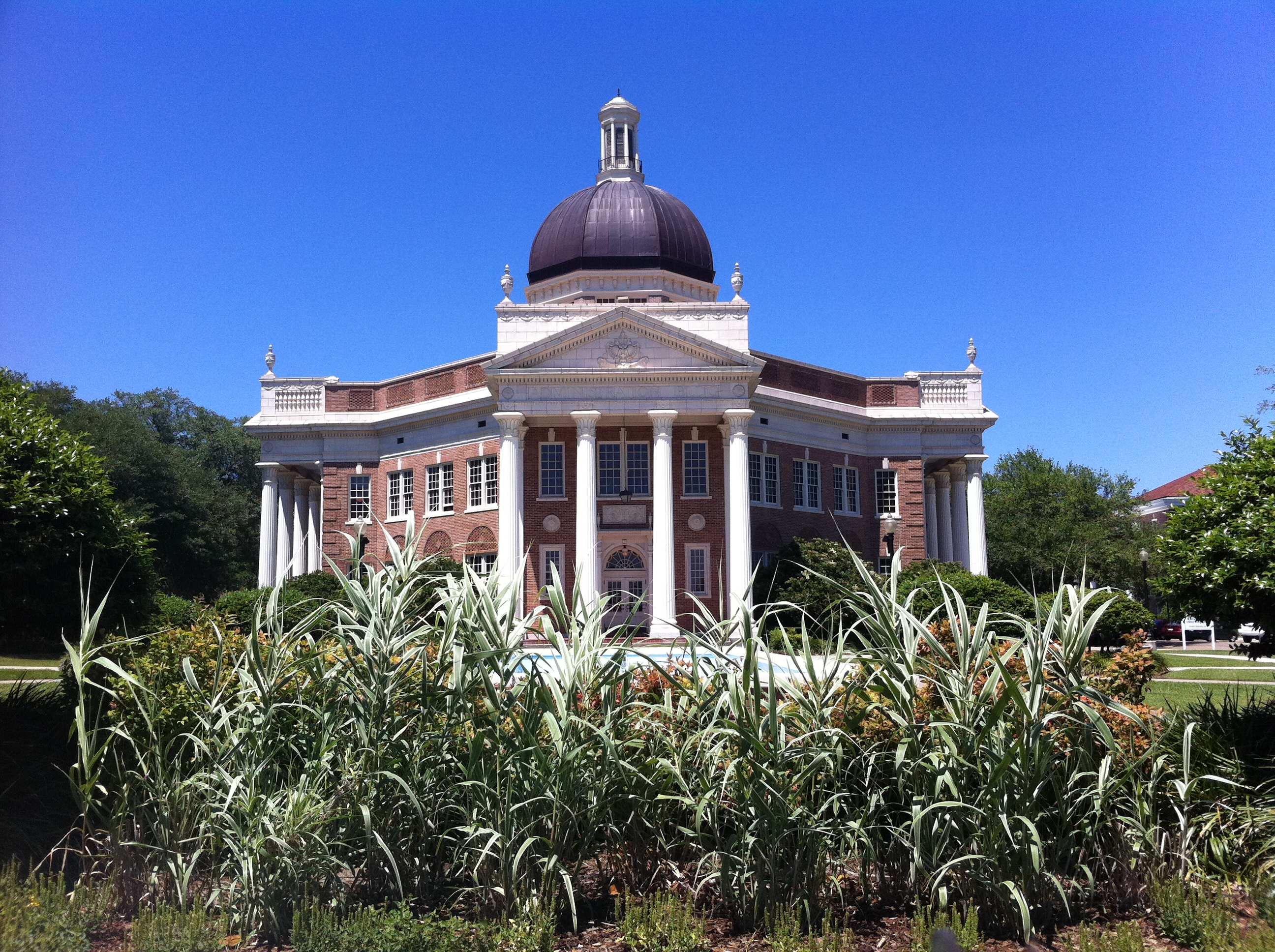
The Aubrey K. Lucas Administration Building in 2011

The Aubrey K. Lucas Administration Building is the most prominent building on the campus of the University of Southern Mississippi. It is named after one of the universities more popular and longest serving Presidents, Dr. Aubrey K. Lucas. The Administration building houses many various offices most importantly the Office of the President.

The building was completed in 1930.

== The Dome ==
In the administration building, an area referred to by USM students and staff as "The Dome" can be found directly ahead, when entering campus from the Hardy Street main entrance. The Dome of the administration building is prominently featured on the Southern Miss seal, and is the official logo of the university in its non-athletic entity.

The fountain in front of The Dome was built in 1972.

== Hurricane Katrina ==
In 2005, the building was heavily damaged by Hurricane Katrina. Since then, the copper panels have been replaced on the dome portion of the building, restoring it to its original look, before the copper slowly turned to green over time after oxidation.

== 2015 work ==
An estimated two-year, $2.55 million renovation of the building's foundation and exterior details began in September 2015.
