= Camden Free Public Library Main Building =

- U.S. National Register of Historic Places
- New Jersey Register of Historic Places
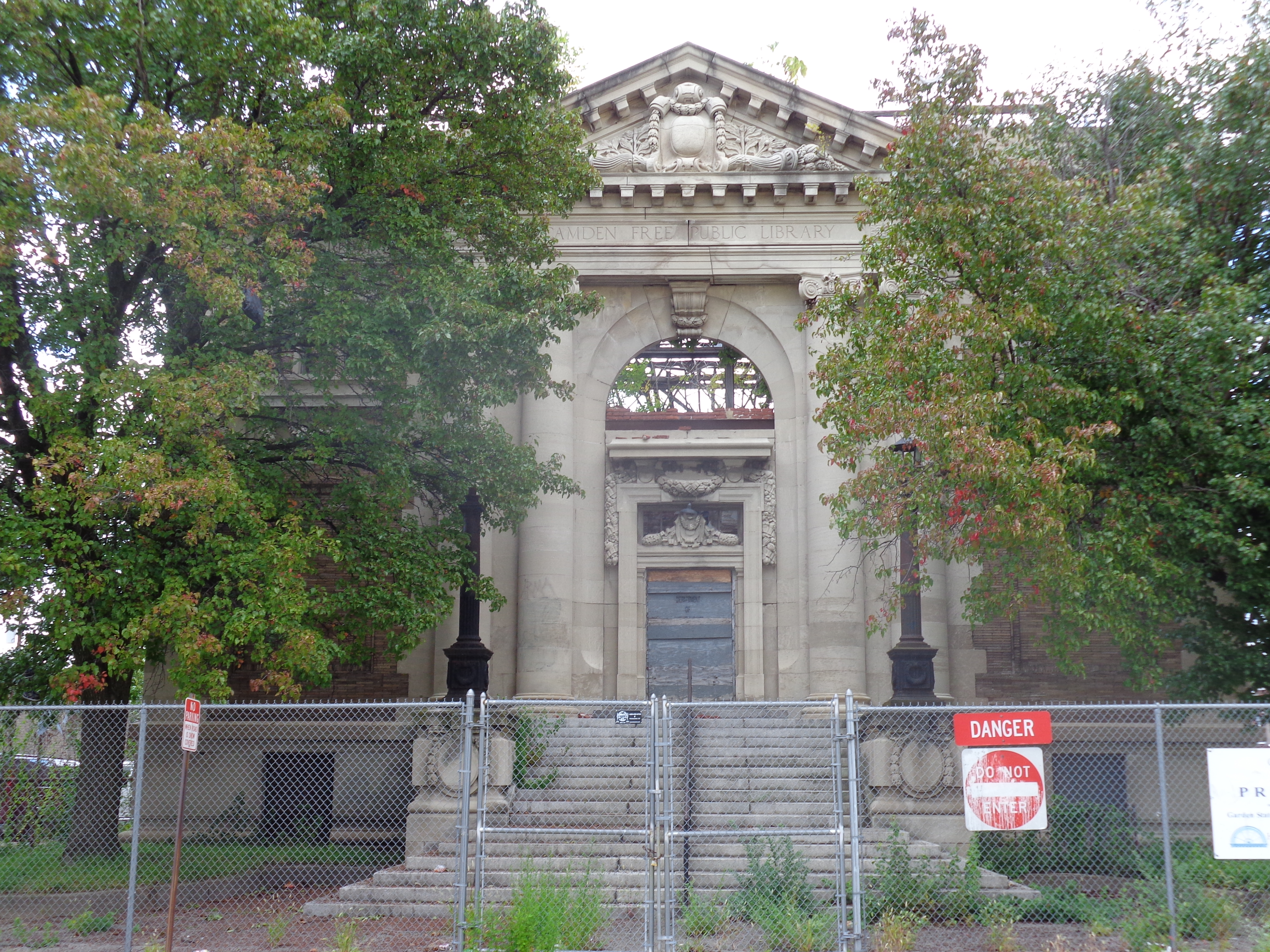

- Location within Camden County, New Jersey Location within New Jersey Location within the United States
- Location: 616 Broadway; Camden, New Jersey
- Coordinates: 39°56′14″N 75°7′6″W
- Built: 1903
- Architect: Herbert D. Hale; Henry G. Morse
- NRHP reference No.: 92001385
- NJRHP No.: 894

Significant dates
- Added to NRHP: October 15, 1992
- Designated NJRHP: September 2, 1992

The Camden Free Public Library Main Building is the first former main library of the Camden, New Jersey public library system. Designed by Herbert D. Hale and Henry G. Morse, the building was constructed with a grant from the Carnegie Corporation and opened in 1905. It closed in 1986 with the relocation of the library's main branch to the former South Jersey Gas, Electric and Traction Company Office Building. In 1992, the building was placed on the state and national registers of historic places. The building has fallen into state of serious disrepair. In 2003, funding was found for its stabilization, with the hope that it would be preserved and re-used.

The city's once extensive library system has been beleaguered by financial difficulties. In 2010, it threatened to close but was incorporated by the county library system. Nonetheless, the main branch did close in February 2011.

== See also ==
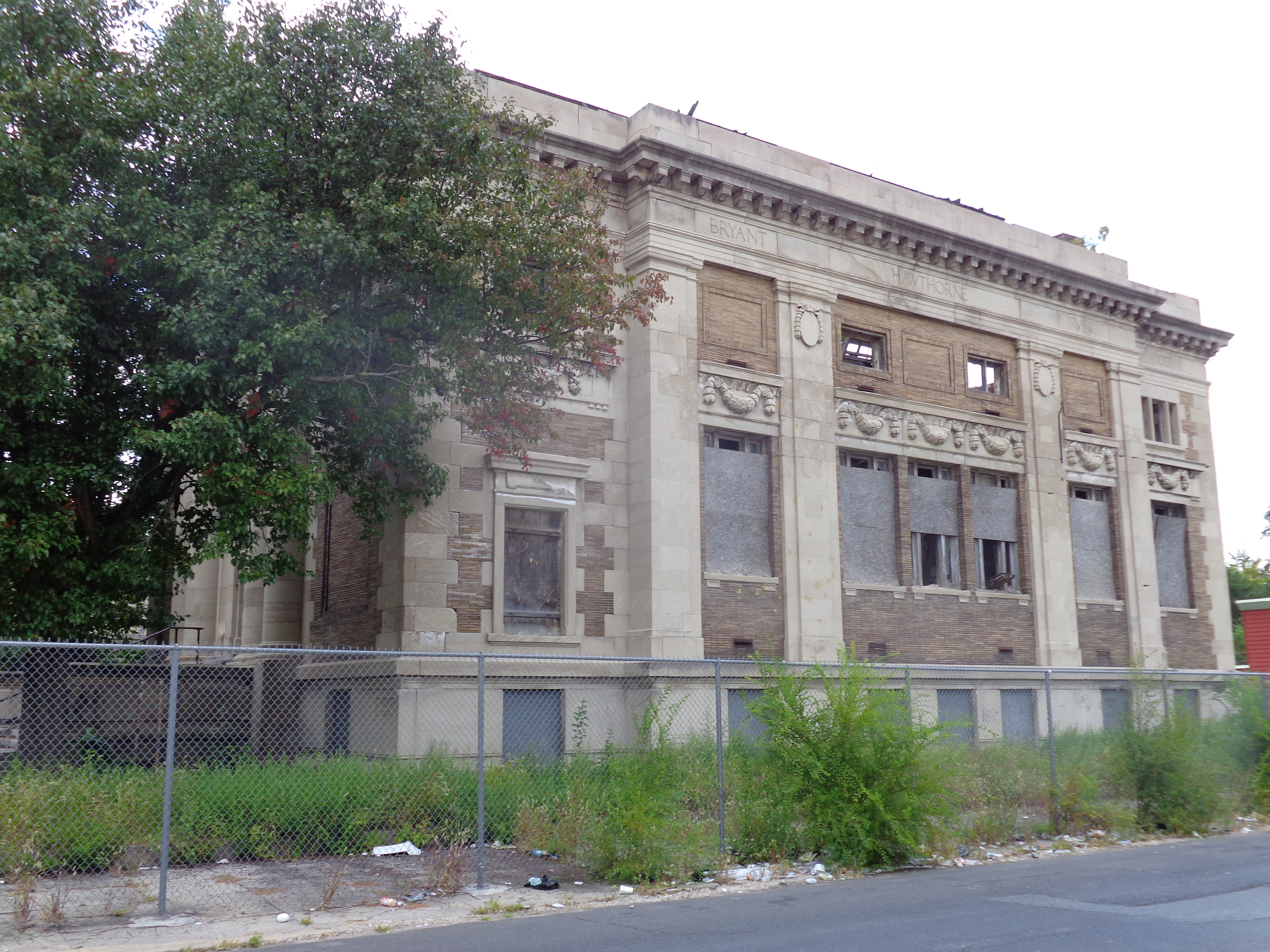

- Cooper Library in Johnson Park
- List of Carnegie libraries in New Jersey
- National Register of Historic Places listings in Camden County, New Jersey
- Carnegie library
