= Administration Building (Seattle University) =

Building in Seattle, Washington, U.S.

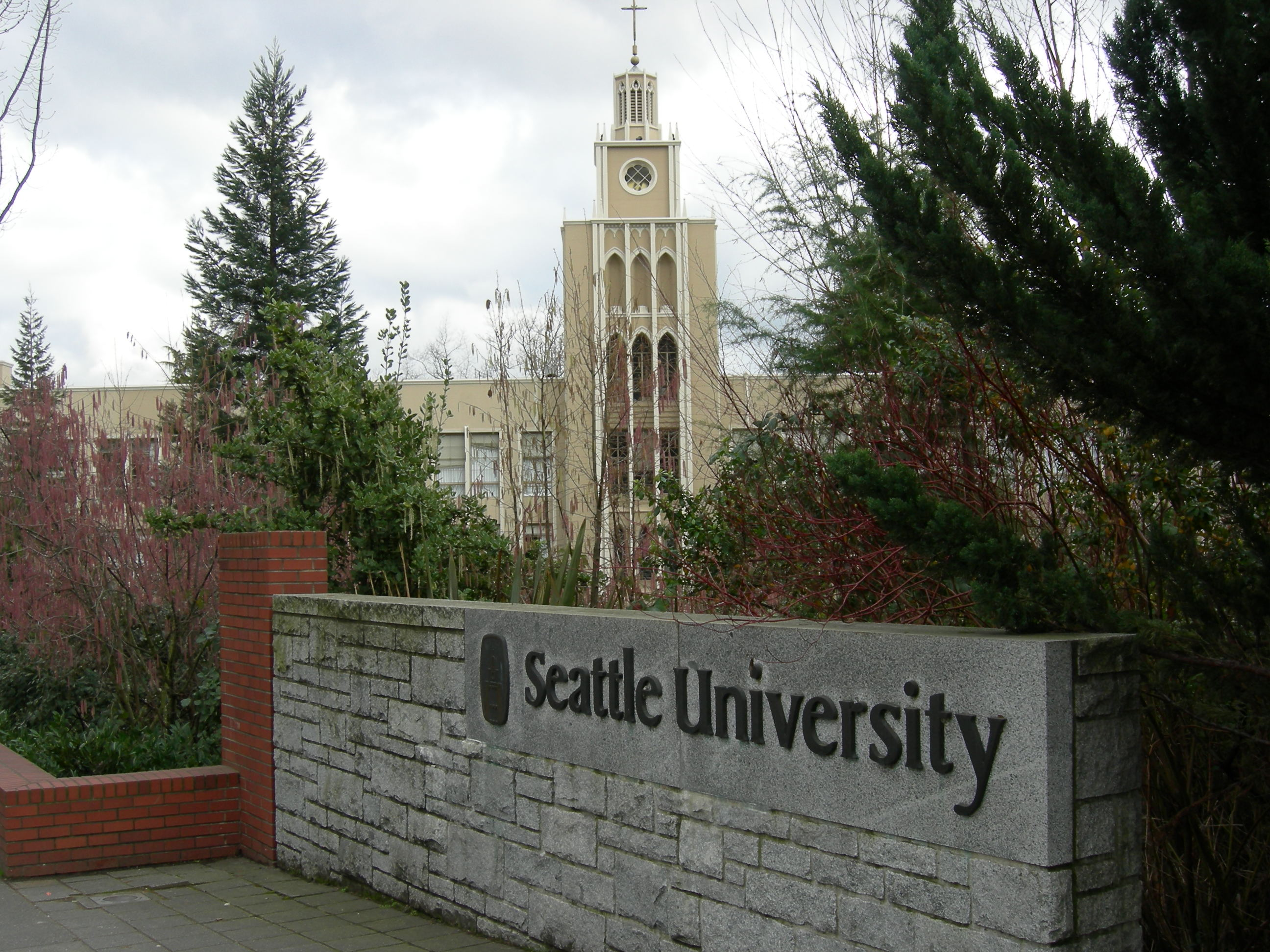
- The building's exterior, 2007
- Interactive map of the Administration Building area

General information
- Location: Seattle, Washington, United States
- Coordinates: 47°36′40″N 122°19′11″W

The Administration Building is a building on the Seattle University campus, in the U.S. state of Washington.

== History ==
The building received a new entryway in 2017.

In 2022, students hosted a sit-in at the building over a policy related to LGBT rights.

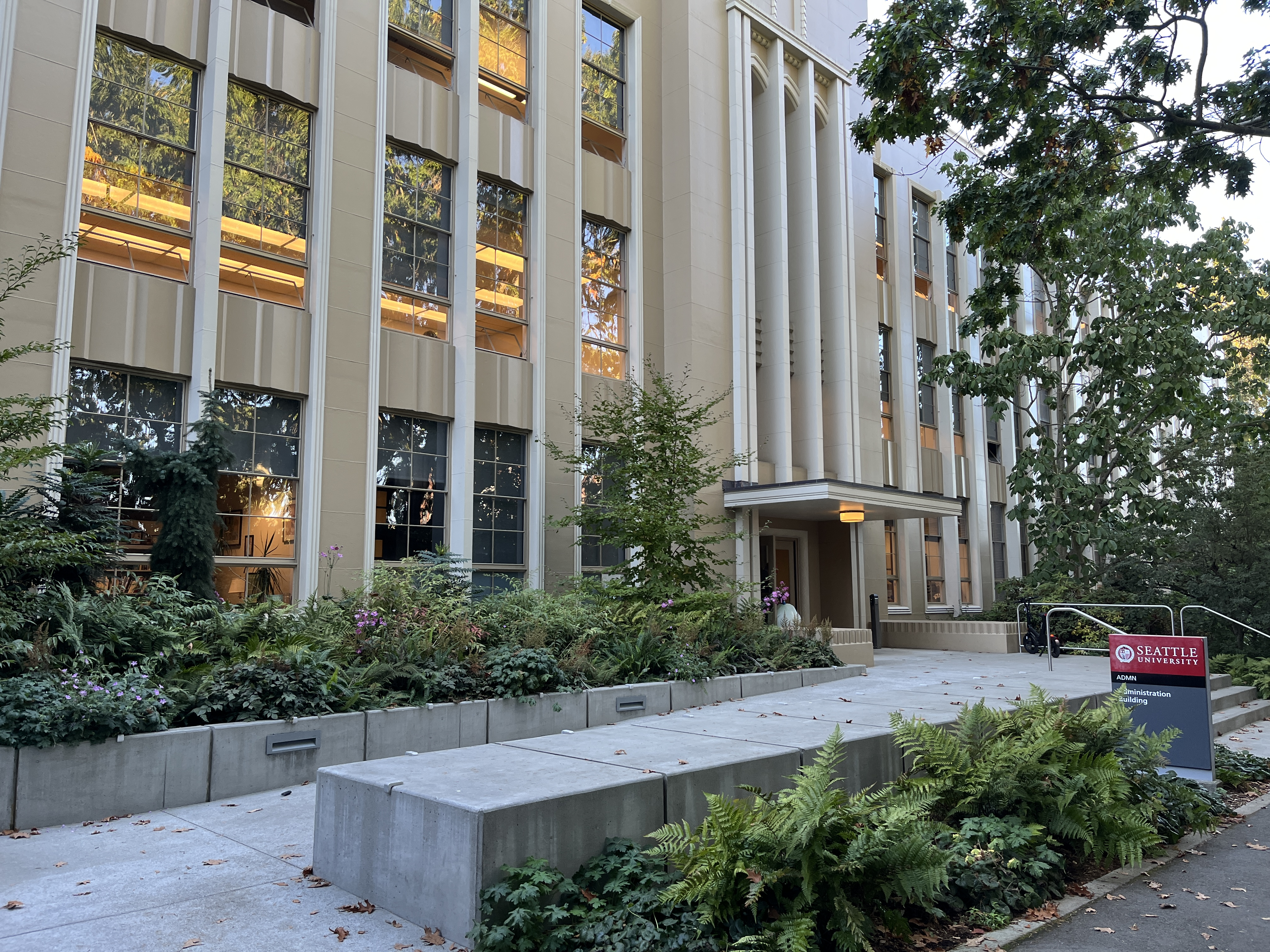
Exterior

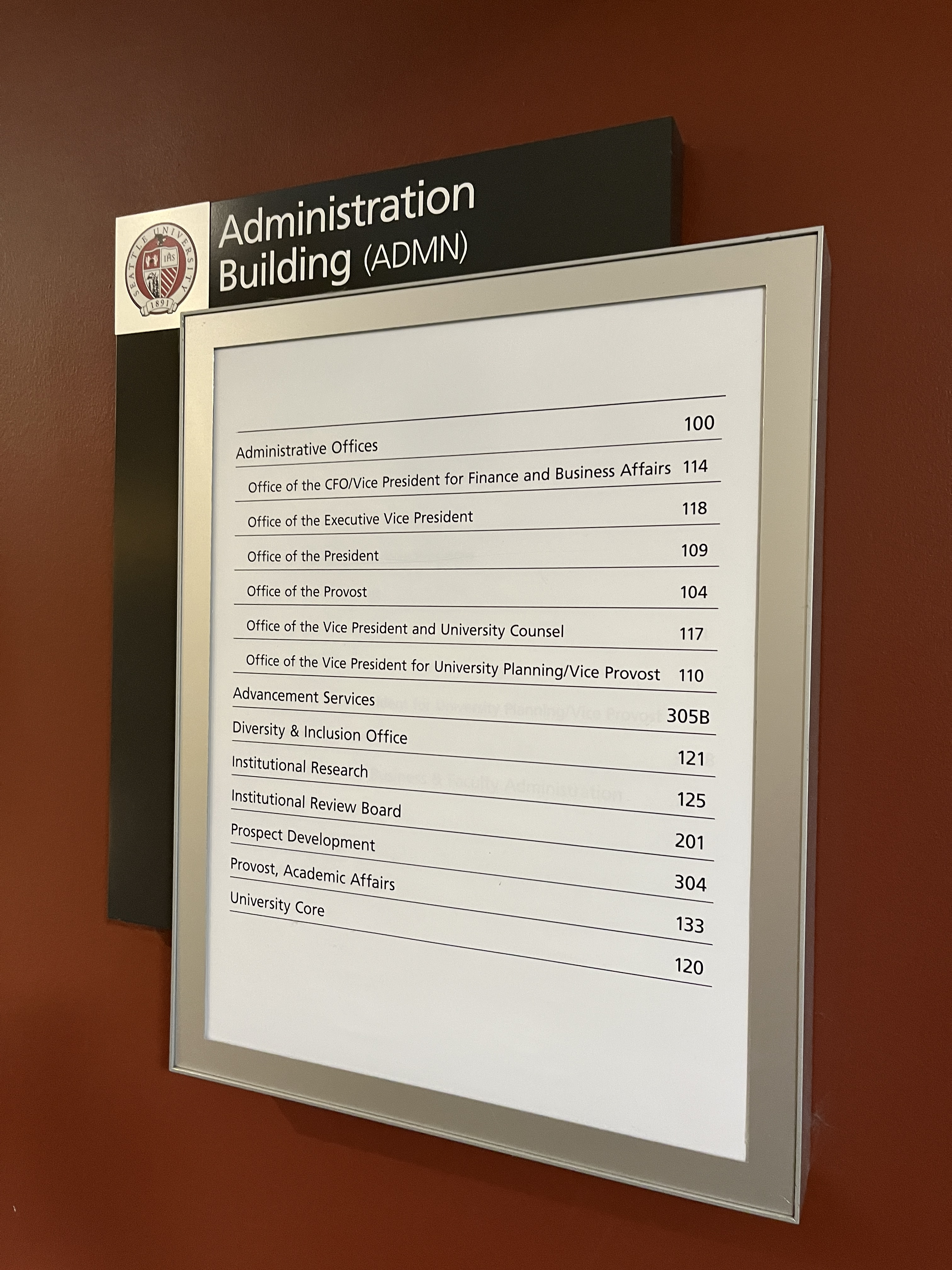
Interior sign

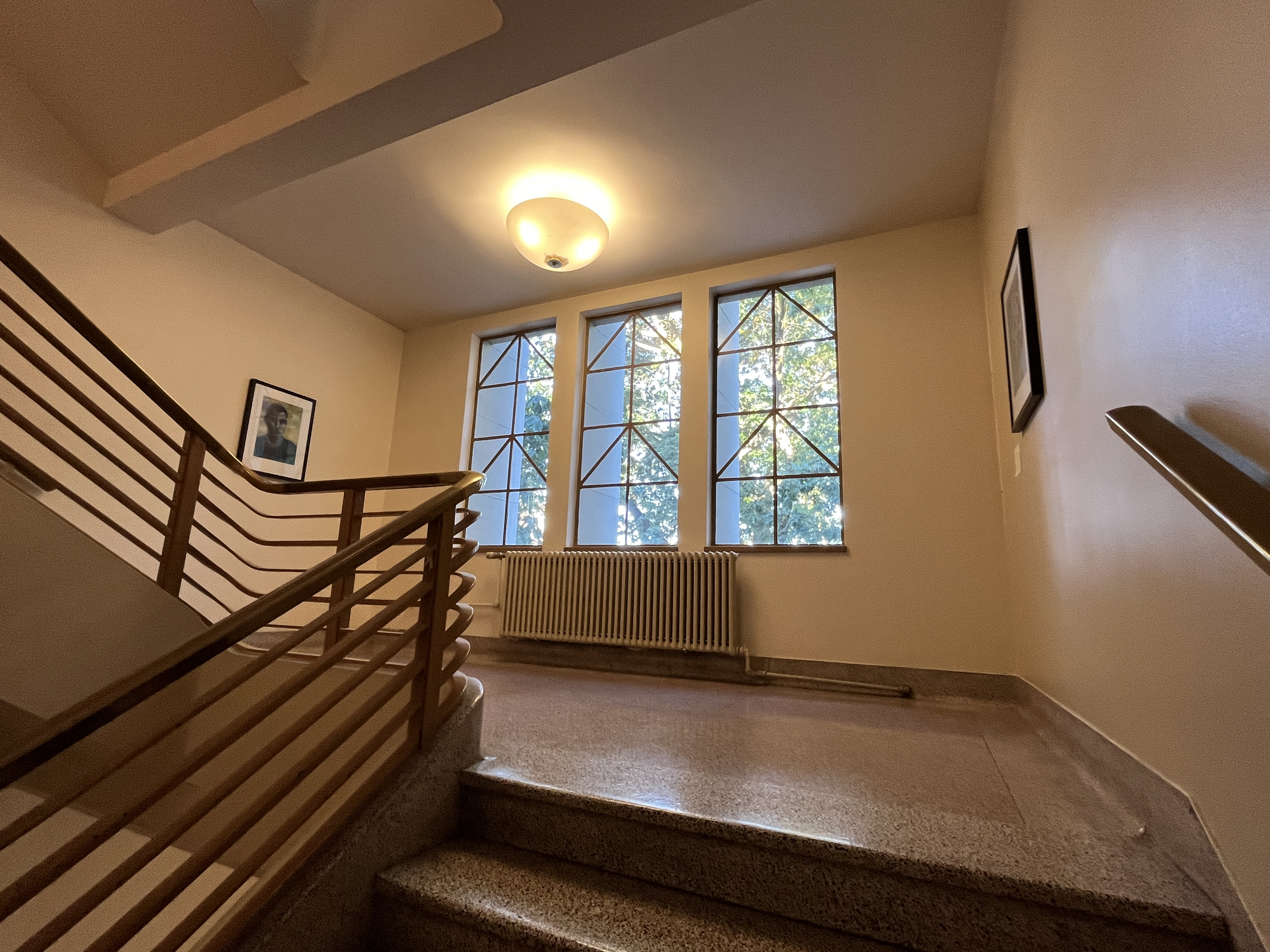
Interior

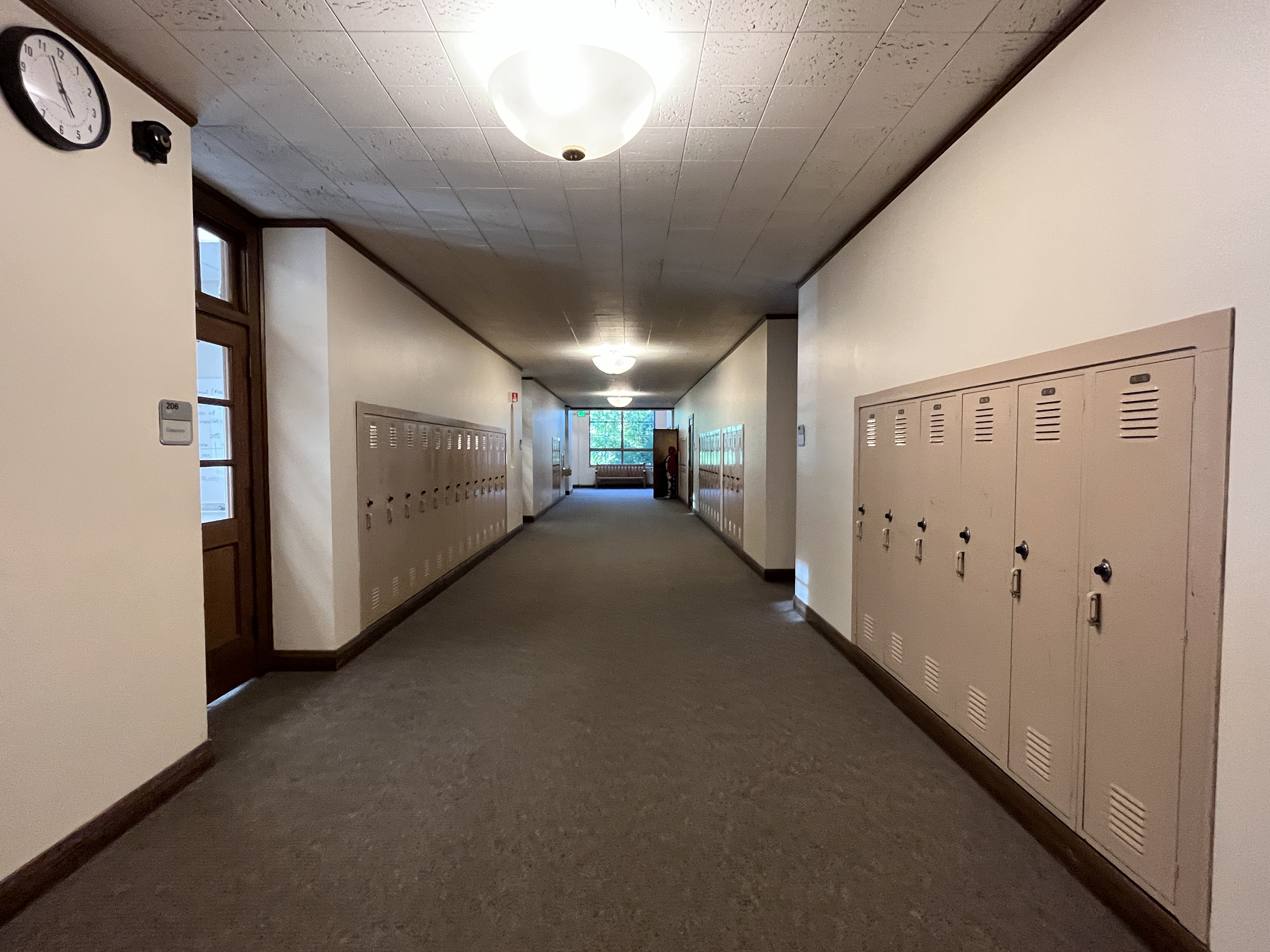
Interior
