= Xavier University Main Building, Convent and Library =

- U.S. National Register of Historic Places
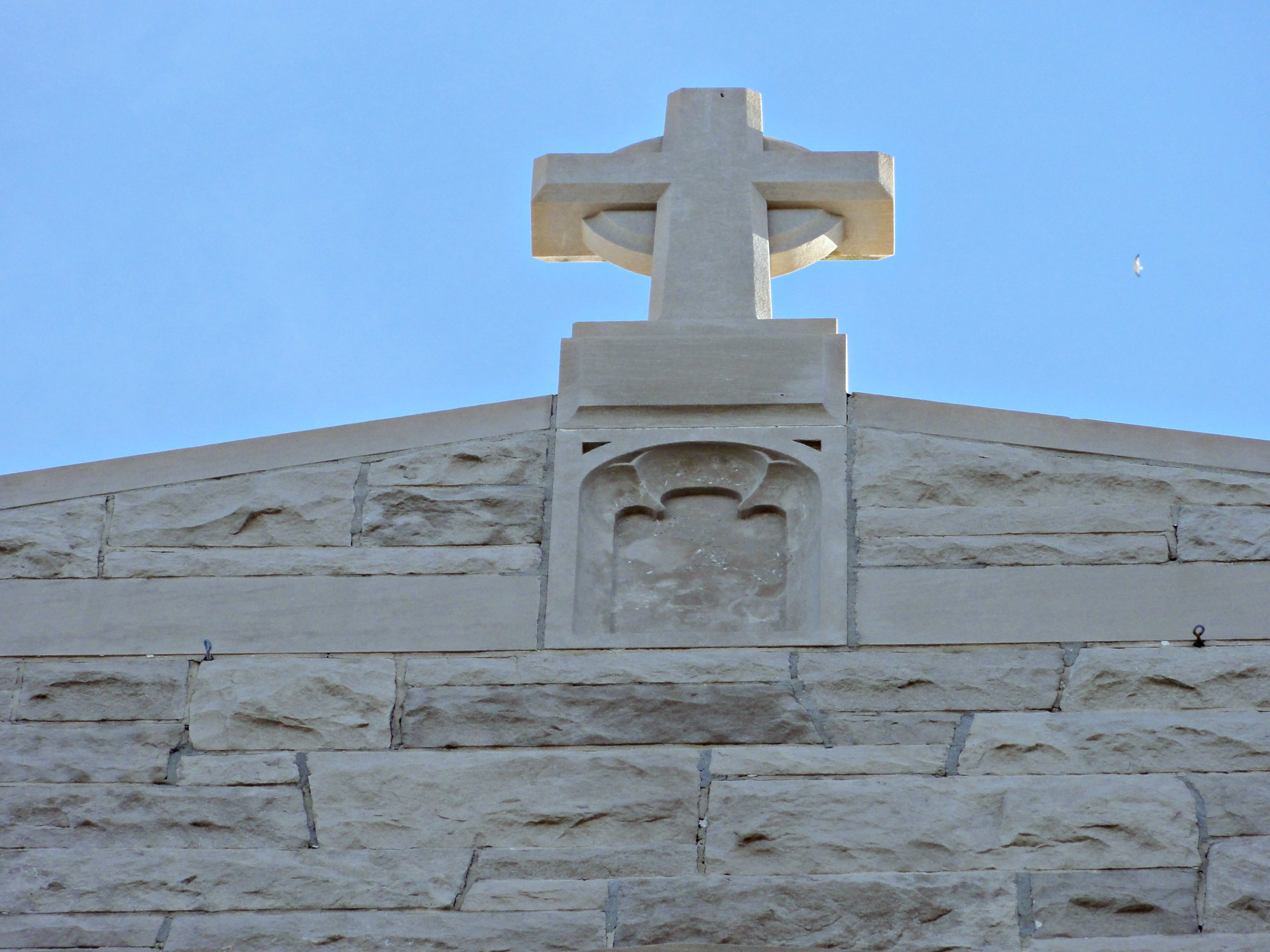
- Limestone cross on top of the building

- Location within Louisiana Location within the United States
- Location: 1 Drexel Dr., New Orleans, Louisiana
- Coordinates: 29°57′57″N 90°6′26″W
- Area: 4 acres (1.6 ha)
- Built: 1932
- Architect: Wogan and Bernard; Glover, George and Company
- Architectural style: Late Gothic Revival
- NRHP reference No.: 04000114
- Added to NRHP: March 3, 2004

The Xavier University Main Building, Convent and Library are three late Gothic Revival architecture style buildings on the campus of Xavier University of Louisiana in New Orleans, listed on the National Register of Historic Places.

The buildings are a three-story main building built in 1932, a 2 1/2-story convent built in 1932, and a two-story library built in 1937.

== Details ==
The three buildings, fronted by Drexel Drive, represent the original buildings of the Xavier campus, following the campus' move from the Xavier University Preparatory School/St. Katharine Drexel Preparatory School 5100 Magazine Street address. The Administration building is also named as a City of New Orleans landmark, although it does not appear on the list of city Historical Landmarks. According to the National Register of Historic Places nomination the main building and the convent are two distinct buildings, while some sources describe the structures as two wings of a single structure.

The main building and convent are constructed of Indiana limestone.
