= Main Building School =

- U.S. National Register of Historic Places
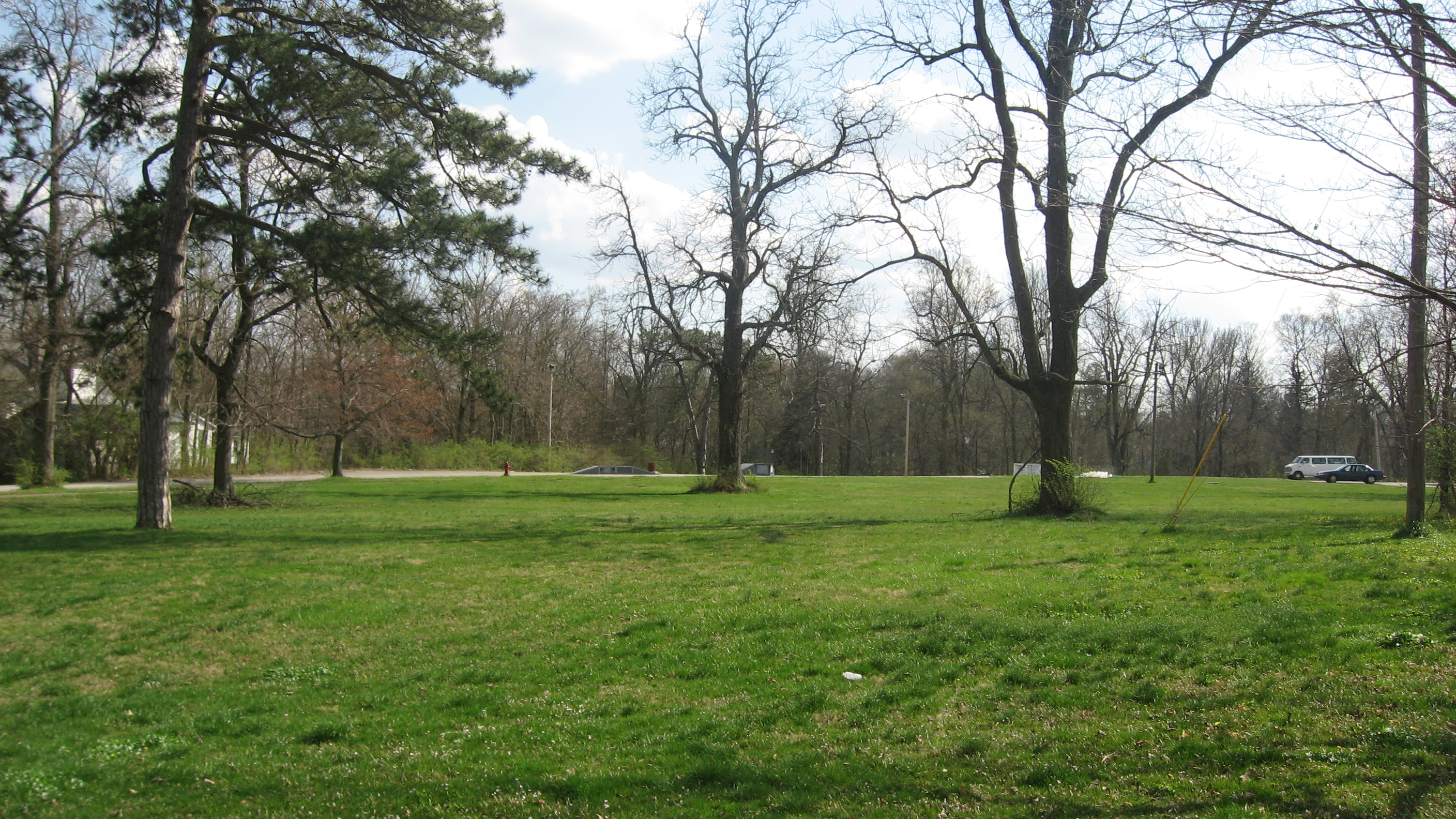
- Photo from Wikimedia commons asserted to be of the former site of the school

- Location within Ohio Location within the United States
- Location: Sugartree St., Wilmington, Ohio
- Coordinates: 39°26′36″N 83°50′04″W
- Area: 6 acres (2.4 ha)
- Built: 1869
- Architect: W.M. Cleveland
- Architectural style: Italianate
- NRHP reference No.: 80002960
- Added to NRHP: November 21, 1980

The Main Building School, on Sugartree St. in Wilmington, Ohio, was listed on the National Register of Historic Places in 1980. It was deemed a "fine example" of High Victorian Italianate architecture. It was opened in 1869 and was in continuous use as a school until 1979. The building was demolished in 1997.
