= Main Building (Montgomery, West Virginia) =

- U.S. National Register of Historic Places
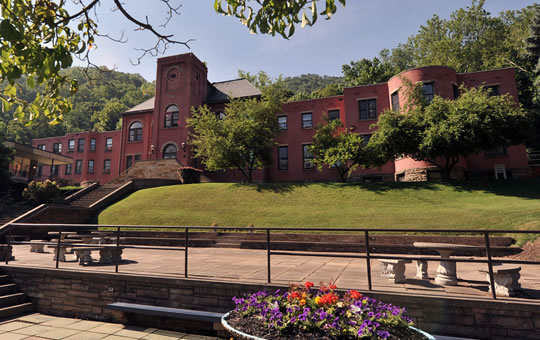
- Old Main Building, September 2012

- Location within West Virginia Location within the United States
- Location: West Virginia University Institute of Technology campus, Montgomery, West Virginia
- Coordinates: 38°10′45″N 81°19′31″W
- Area: 0.5 acres (0.20 ha)
- Built: 1895
- NRHP reference No.: 80004019
- Added to NRHP: June 25, 1980

Main Building, also known as "Old Main," is a historic building located on the former campus of West Virginia University Institute of Technology at Montgomery, Fayette County, West Virginia. It was built in 1895–1897. In 1898 and 1905, two-story wings were attached to each side of the original unit. The total length is 207 feet. It features a projecting three story, square entrance tower with a slate covered hipped roof.

It was listed on the National Register of Historic Places in 1980.
