= Administration Building (University of Memphis) =

Administrative building of the University of Memphis in Tennessee, USA

Coordinates: 35.118910259678024°N 89.93811132796421°W

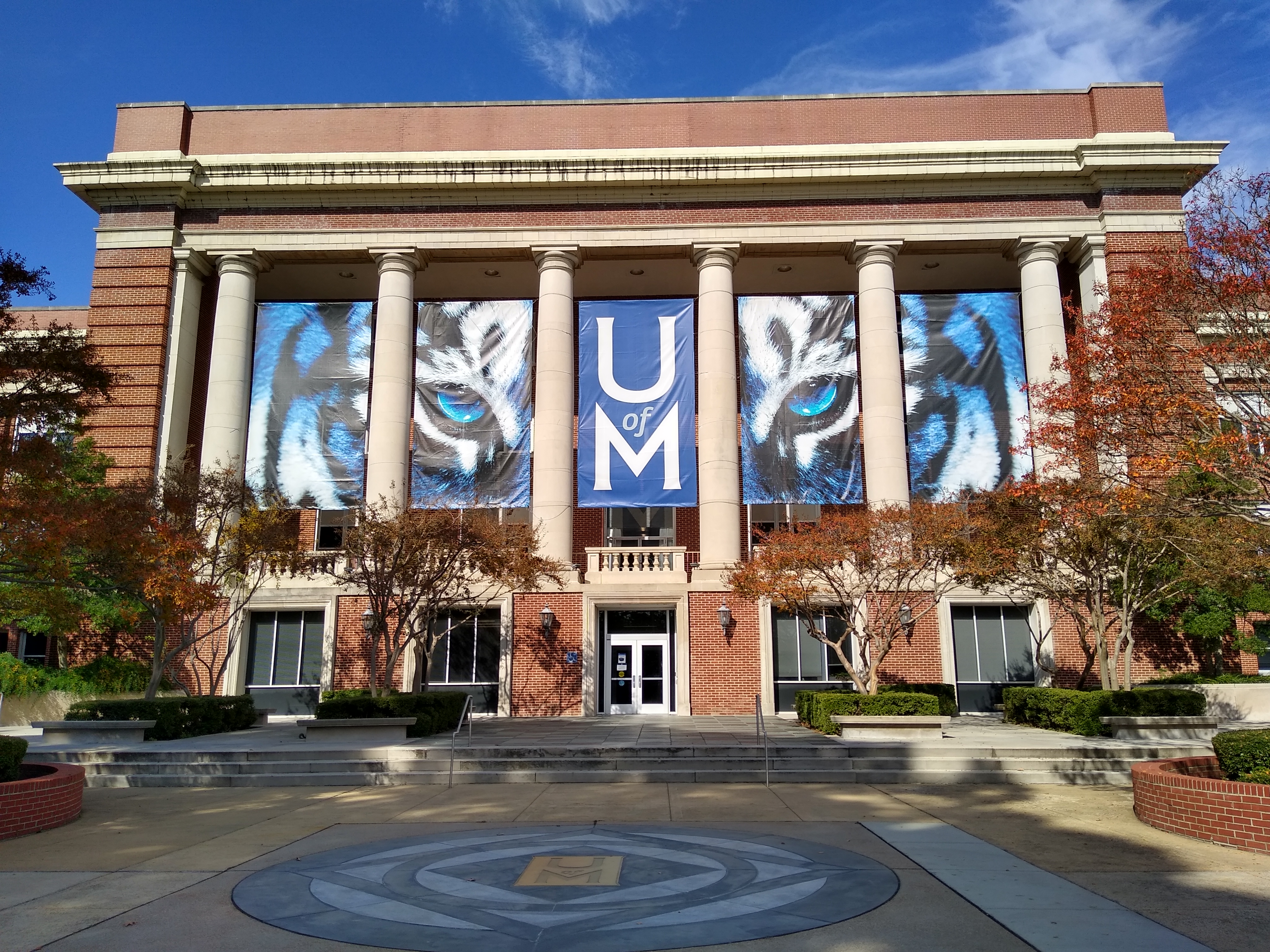
- The Administration Building on the University of Memphis campus
- Interactive map of the Administration Building area

General information
- Location: Memphis, Tennessee
- Construction started: 1911
- Completed: 1912

Technical details
- Floor count: 4

Other information
- Public transit: MATA

The Administration Building is a structure on the campus of the University of Memphis in Memphis, TN. Along with Mynders Hall and the President’s House, the then named Administration/Academic Building was one of the three original buildings on the campus. Construction began in 1911, and all three structures were collectively dedicated on September 10, 1912. In its original configuration, the building had a large staircase on the front of the structure leading to what is now the second floor. For many years, these steps were the site of many campus group gatherings and photographs. Many fraternities and sororities held initiation activities on the staircase as well. For example, fraternity pledges were required to push pennies up the steps with their noses and sororities required initiates to clean the steps with toothbrushes. In the university’s early years, male athletes lived on the top floor of the building. The stairs were later removed, and a large addition was installed on the rear of the building. Into the 1940s, the student handbook declared that first year students were not allowed to “use the front steps of the Administration Building” on Mondays, Wednesdays, and Fridays for the first six weeks of the school year.

== Photo gallery ==
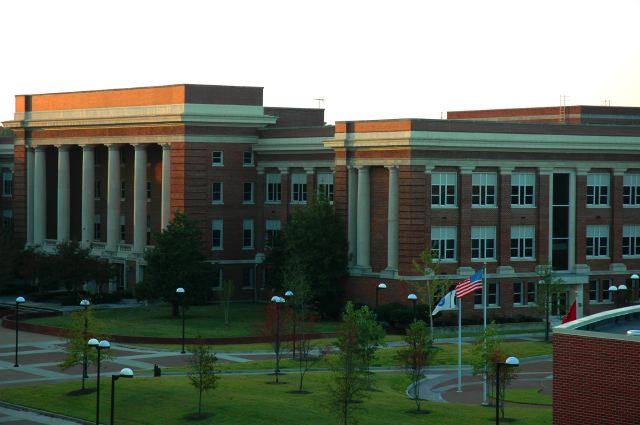
Administration Building in 2007

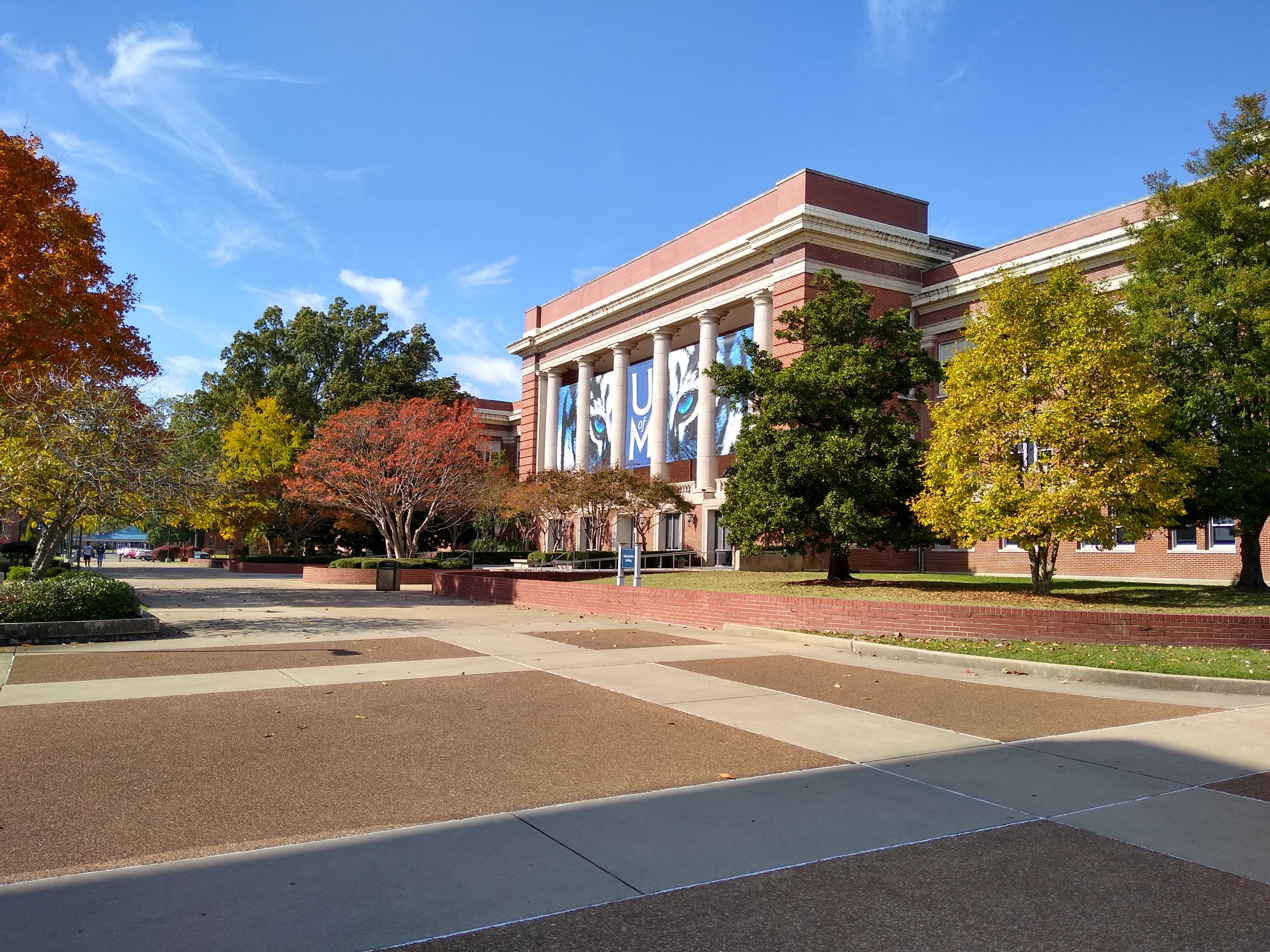
Administration Building in 2020
