= KVC Health Systems =

American child welfare organization

KVC Health Systems, Inc.
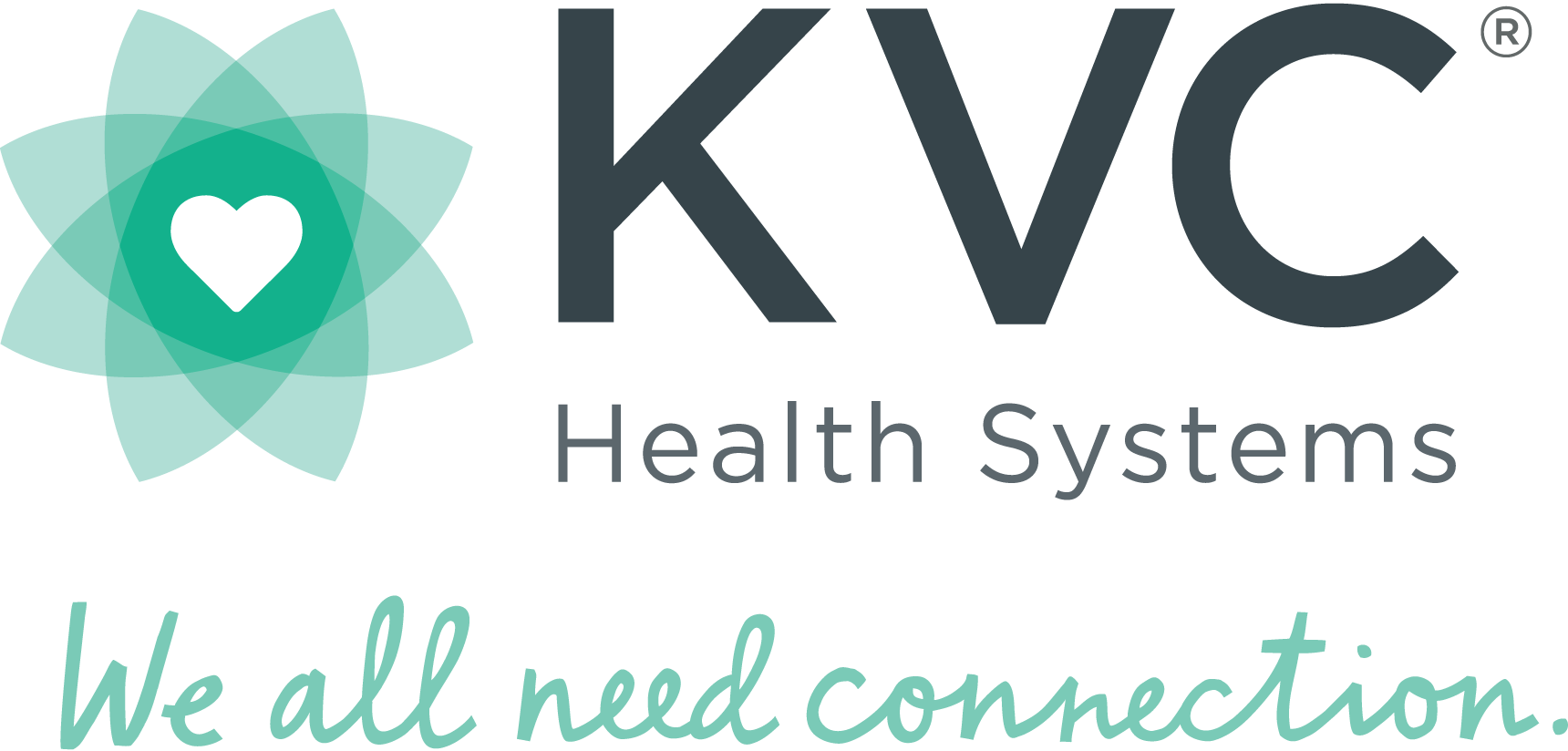
- Founded: 1970
- Founders: Ellen McCarthy, JoAnn & Fred Ball and family, Junior League of Wyandotte and Johnson Counties
- Location: 21350 W. 153rd Street, Olathe, Kansas
- Origins: Kansas City, Kansas, U.S.
- Region served: United States
- Key people: Jason Hooper, CEO; B. Wayne Sims, Past CEO
- Website: www.kvc.org
- Formerly called: Kaw Valley Center, Wyandotte House

KVC Health Systems, Inc. (KVC) is a private, nonprofit child welfare and behavioral healthcare organization. When Kansas became the first U.S. state to privatize its child welfare services in 1996, it selected KVC to be one of the nonprofit service providers. As of 2023, KVC Kansas is the only nonprofit organization that has continually been a foster care case management provider for more than 25 years.

== History ==
What is now KVC Health Systems started in 1970 as Wyandotte House in Wyandotte County, Kansas. B. Wayne Sims was hired in 1980 as president and CEO. He contributed some of the organization's guiding philosophies including, “What would you want for your child?” and “There is no magic answer down the street." He retired at the end of 2015, completing 35 years as KVC's president and CEO. The current CEO is Jason Hooper.

When the state of Kansas became the first state to privatize child welfare services in 1996, KVC was selected as one of the contractors. In 2023, KVC remains the only original case management provider who has provided that service continually for over 25 years. These services are provided through subsidiary KVC Kansas, also known as KVC Behavioral HealthCare. An August 2013 visit to Kansas by a delegation from Singapore's government attests to KVC's success in improving outcomes for vulnerable children.

== Overview ==
KVC provides services for children and families including in-home family support, foster care, adoption, mental and behavioral healthcare, and inpatient children's psychiatric treatment.

The organization has been accredited by The Joint Commission since 1991.

KVC Health Systems is the parent organization of subsidiaries including:

- KVC Kansas (also known as KVC Behavioral HealthCare)
- Camber Children's Mental Health also known as KVC Hospitals, with hospitals in Kansas City, Wichita and Hays
- KVC Missouri (also known as KVC Behavioral HealthCare Missouri)
- KVC Nebraska (also known as KVC Behavioral HealthCare Nebraska)
- KVC West Virginia (also known as KVC Behavioral HealthCare West Virginia)
- KVC Kentucky (also known as KVC Behavioral HealthCare Kentucky)
- KVC Foundation

State and federal agencies as well as international governments often call on KVC Health Systems to provide consulting on how to improve child welfare.
