= Near West End =

Coordinates: 37°34′10″N 77°30′30″W

Near West End is a collection of neighborhoods in the western half of the Richmond, Virginia city limits, but not necessarily in suburban Henrico County. Near West End is subdivided into Windsor Farms, Lockgreen, Mary Munford, University of Richmond, and Westhampton.
