= Virginia House =

Historic house in Virginia, United States

- U.S. National Register of Historic Places
- Virginia Landmarks Register
- Richmond City Historic District
- Location within Virginia Location within the United States
- Interactive map of Virginia House
- Location: 4301 Sulgrave Rd., Richmond, Virginia
- Coordinates: 37°33′13″N 77°30′11″W
- Area: 8.8 acres (3.6 ha)
- Built: 1925
- Architect: Henry G. Morse (re-creation); Charles Gillette (landscape); William Lawrence Bottomley (1946 addition)
- Architectural style: Classical Revival, Tudor Revival, Flemish
- NRHP reference No.: 89001933
- VLR No.: 127-0255

Significant dates
- Added to NRHP: June 13, 1990
- Designated VLR: June 20, 1989

Virginia House is a manor house on a hillside overlooking the James River in the Windsor Farms neighborhood of Richmond, Virginia, United States.

The house was constructed from the materials of the 16th-century Priory House, Warwick in Warwickshire, England, and shipped over and reassembled, completed several months before the stock market crash of 1929. Virginia House is in the Tudor architectural style but incorporates a range of designs from other English houses and has modern facilities such as ten baths and central heating.

Virginia House was built by Alexander and Virginia Weddell, salvaging many materials from the Priory and other old English manor houses and adding further elegant English and Spanish antiques, oriental carpets, silks, and silver. Today Virginia House is operated by the Virginia Historical Society as a house museum, although it largely remains as it was in the 1940s during the Weddells’ tenancy. Immediately to the west of the property is Agecroft Hall.

== History ==
The façade of Virginia House was originally located on the grounds of the former Augustinian Priory of the Holy Sepulcher of Jerusalem (Warwick Priory) in Warwick, England, founded in 1109. In 1536, at the Dissolution of the Monasteries, the priory was shut down and the land later bought by a politician named Thomas Hawkins alias Fisher, during the reign of Edward VI. Fisher demolished most of the monastic buildings and erected the house which he named "Hawk's Nest," set among gardens. He entertained Elizabeth I at the house. The property was bought in 1709 by Henry Wise, Royal Gardener to Queen Anne. In the mid-nineteenth century, it was purchased by the Lloyds Bank family who put the manor up for sale at auction in 1925.

Alexander W. Weddell, a wealthy American diplomat and his wife Virginia Chase Steedman, however, offered a lump sum of £3,500 for the entire remaining structure and secured a deal before the auction was held. The purchase by the Americans caused an outrage in the British press and the Weddells were heavily criticized given that the heritage property was to be demolished. The objection to the purchase was also backed by a Member of Parliament (MP) who proposed that the sale be invalidated in order to prevent this "act of vandalism". However, the motion was rejected and as it gradually became apparent what the Weddels intentions were, on April 13, 1926, another MP, Frank Rye, sent a letter to Alexander Weddell saying, "Had you not stepped in and bought the materials of the partially demolished structure, they would have been lost for all time, whereas now they will be utilised in the erection of a new building."

The Tudor mansion was dismantled but, concerned that the stone would swiftly disintegrate during the demolition phase, Weddell's advisers ordered that a small explosive device be triggered in the centre of the house and the undamaged stones salvaged. However, the explosion had the effect of splitting the walls intact meaning that much of the building could be salvaged and shipped to the United States. The first shipments arrived in Richmond, Virginia in early 1926, but they were soaked in seawater and had to be dried in a barn for up to six months. From the very beginning, the Weddells planned on deeding the house to the Virginia Historical Society and allocating the west wing of the structure as a museum once it was rebuilt in Virginia. The Weddells also intended the structure to become the society's new headquarters.

Virginia House was constructed in the Windsor Farms neighborhood of Richmond by the General Contracting firm of Allen J. Saville, Inc., although several different architects were employed during the rebuilding. Foundation work began on November 6, 1925, and the structure was officially turned over to the Weddells on January 1, 1929. The total cost of the construction was $236,968.83, with an additional $15,000 spent on buying the lot, a considerable sum for that time.

The Weddells lived at Virginia House until they both died in a train accident in 1948. After their deaths the house became the permanent residence of the historical society. On June 13, 1990, Virginia House was listed on the National Register of Historic Places, due to it being considered "a noteworthy representative of a peculiar residential building type prevalent in the late 19th and early 20th century period of American architecture." During this time – known as the Country Place Era – many wealthy American families built extensive country estates emulating those they had seen while traveling in Europe.

== Structure ==
=== Exterior ===
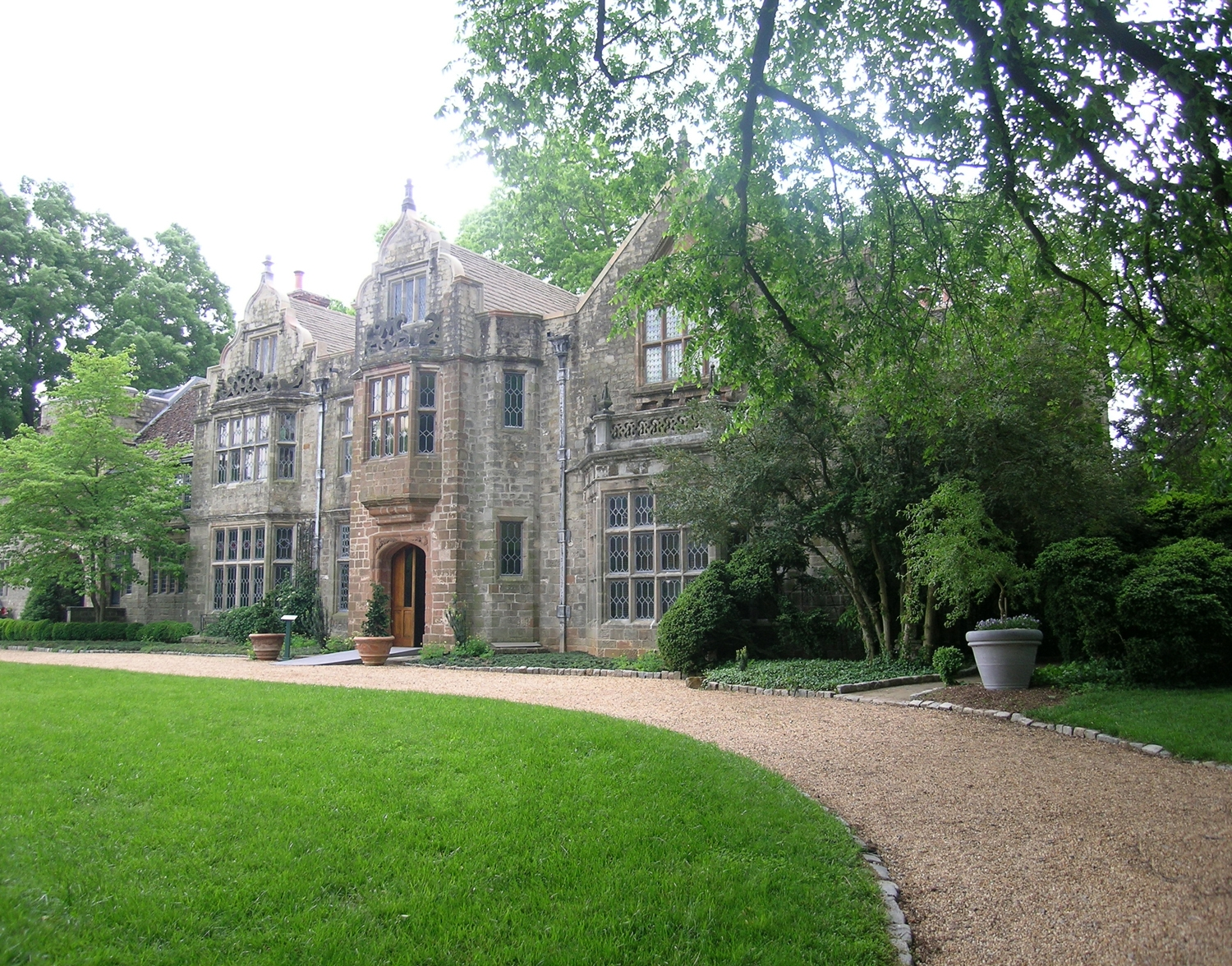
Front façade.

Although many stones and materials were salvaged and used to rebuild the Hawkins priory in Virginia, the reconstructed house incorporated other designs and influences. Following the acquisition of the Warwickshire property, the Weddells hired chief architect Henry Grant Morse and scouted the English countryside, surveying properties and considering various designs they could incorporate into the rebuilding process. As a result, the reconstruction is not a replica of the original building. The west wing of the house is actually a replica of Sulgrave Manor, a small manor house in Northamptonshire, England, which once belonged to Lawrence Washington, an ancestor of America's first president, George Washington. However, the center of the house is a reproduction of the original Warwickshire priory and uses the curvilinear gables, strapwork design, and balustrades that the English commonly adapted from the Low Countries in the early seventeenth century. The east wing of the house, however, is based on Wormleighton Manor, a Spencer family estate in England.

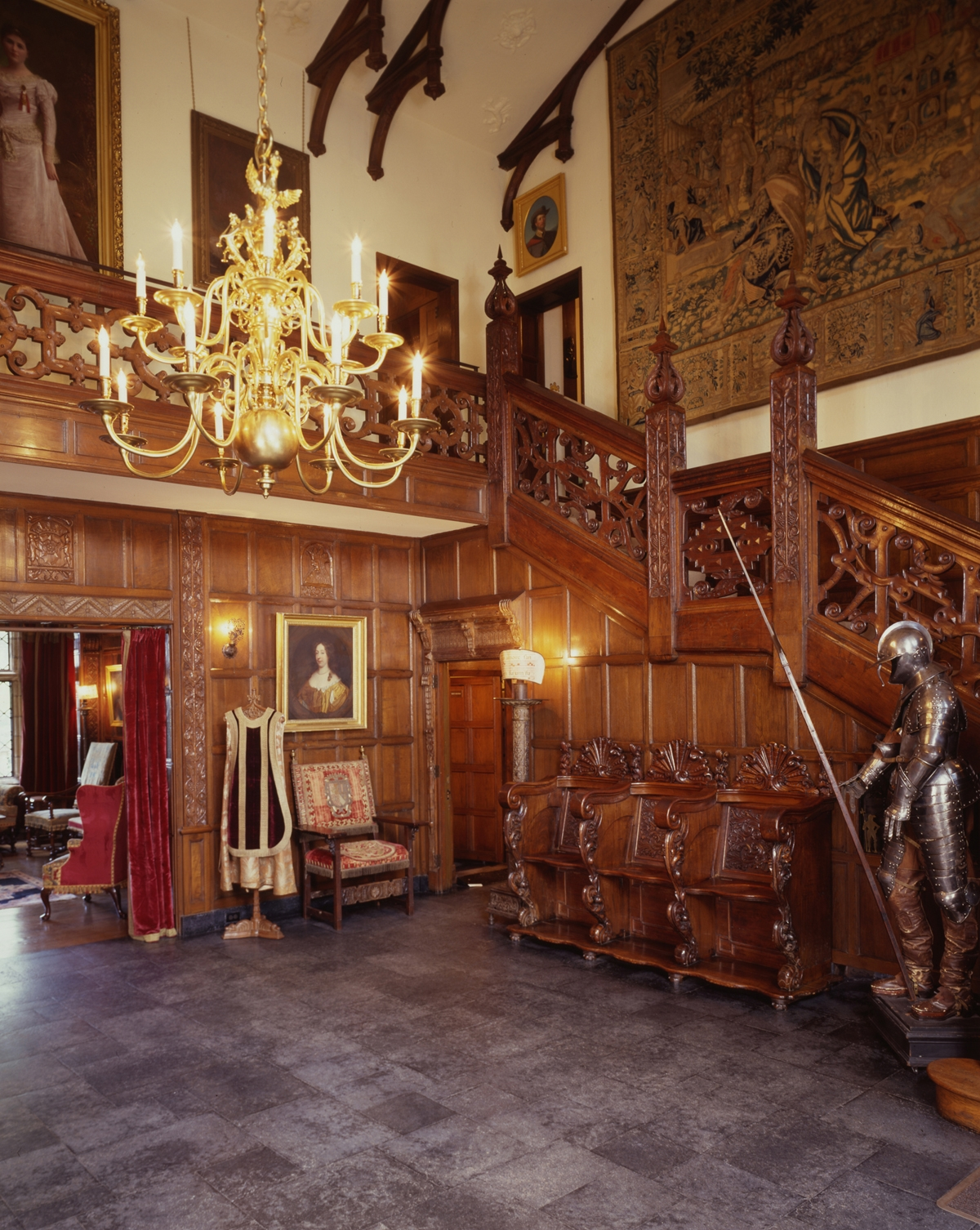
Great Hall.

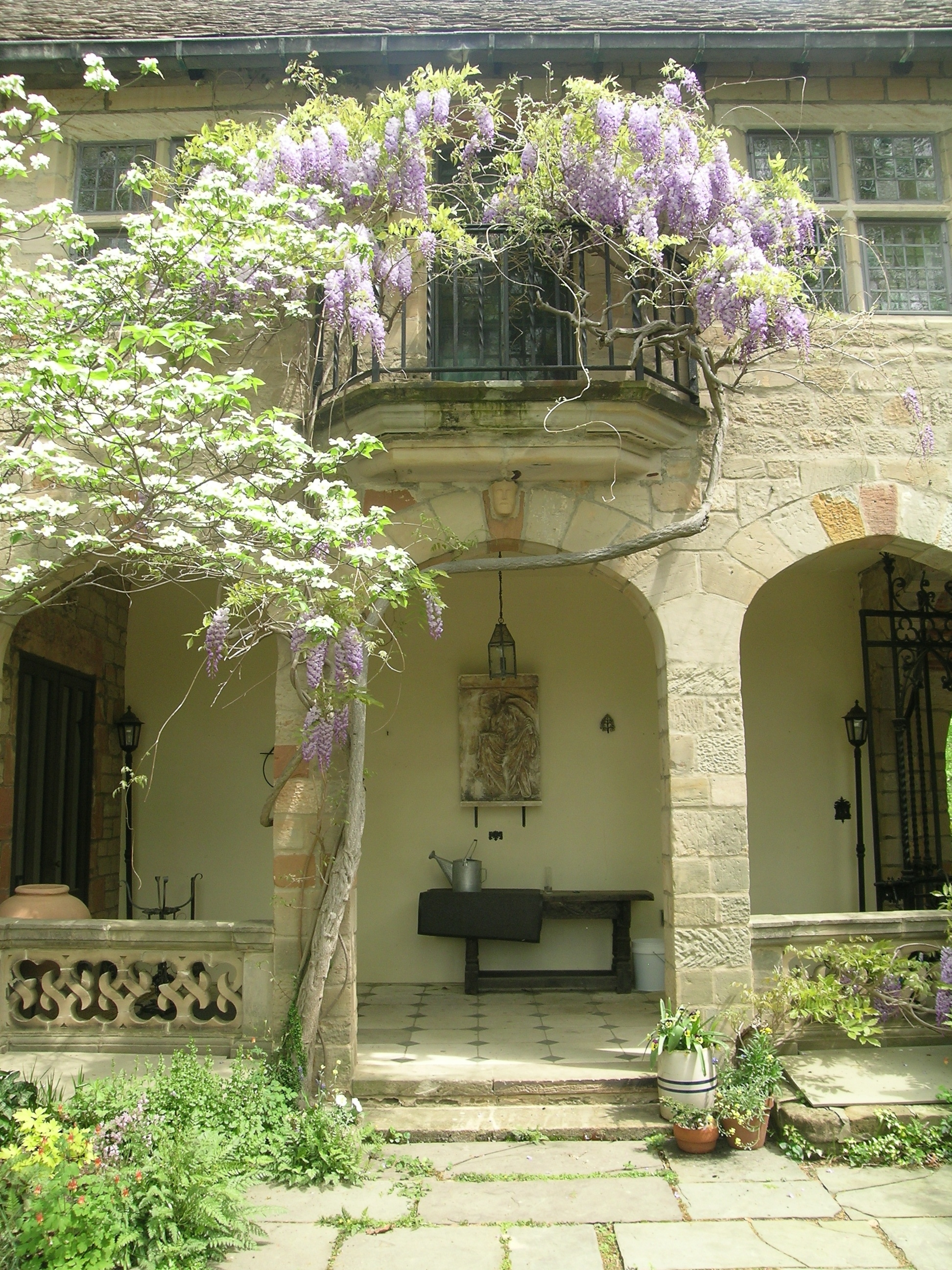
The arcade.

=== Interior ===
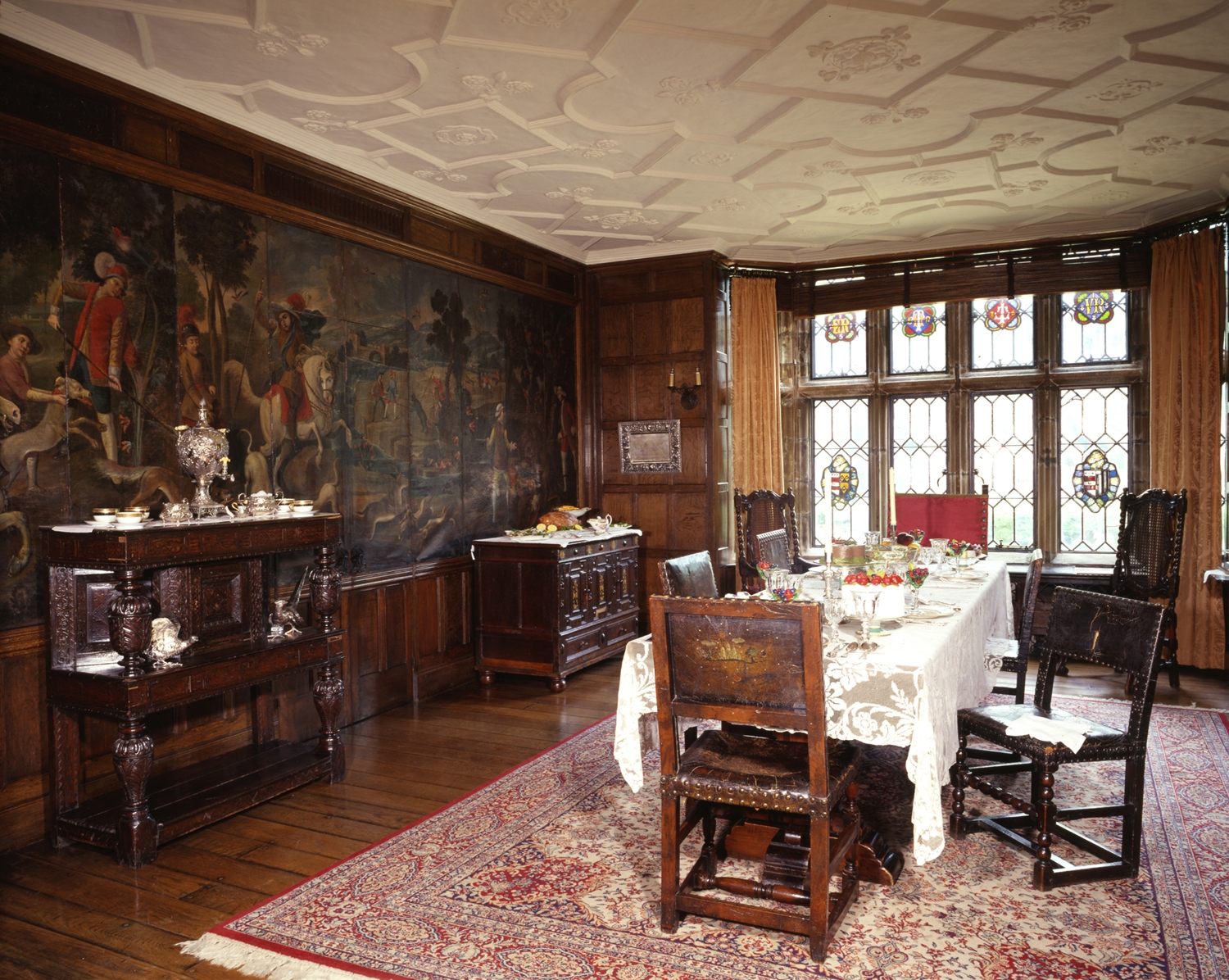
Dining Room.

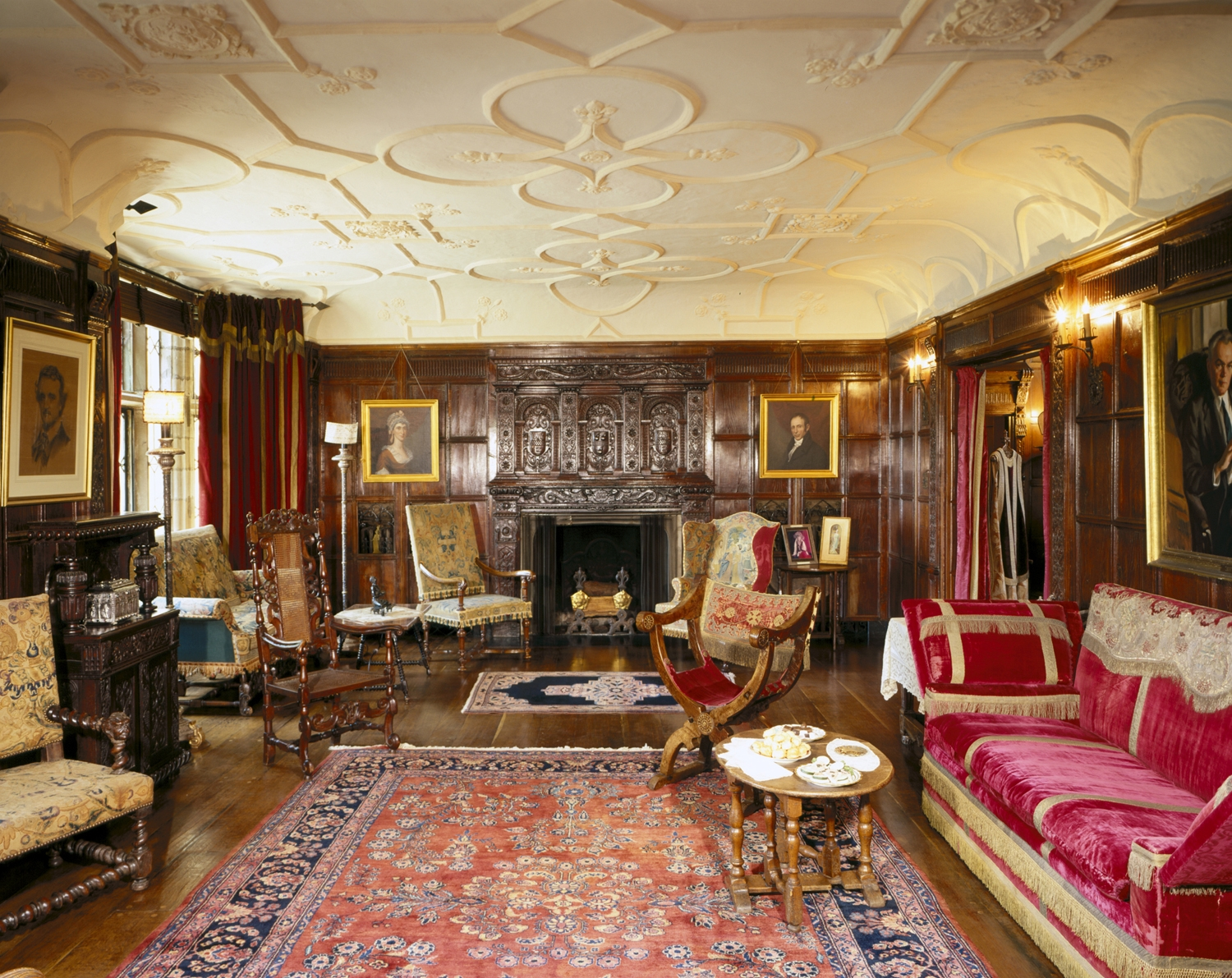
Withdrawing Room.

The interior to Virginia House is elegant with oak furnishings and an assortment of English and Spanish antiques, oriental carpets, silks, and silverware. The first floor consists mainly of large, elaborate rooms, intended for social meetings and to house the functions and exhibits of the Virginia Historical Society. The second floor was mainly designed to be used as the private living quarters of the Weddells and their staff and featured a large library, which now functions as the boardroom and research facility of the Virginia Historical Society.

The rear hall again uses old oak high paneling and has small six by nine-inch oil portraits of Renaissance figures. Freestanding Corinthian columns in the hallway form an ornamental gateway and stained glass doors at the end enter the rear porch arcade. The dining room was furnished with oak bought later from Redbourn Manor in Hertfordshire and has an imposing Portland stone fireplace positioned midway in the room. The floor is made of old re-sawn pegged oak and the Tudor rose ceiling motif is repeated. In the southeast wing of the house is the Sulgrave Room, a reproduction of the great hall from the Washington family's Sulgrave Manor. The fireplace mantel is made of an oak beam, once used at the original priory. Heavy oak timbers were used to construct the open beam ceiling in this room, which also features mottled plaster walls.

The grand second-floor library room is also of major note, with a high cathedralesque ceiling and a grand conference table previously used for board meetings by the Virginia Historical Society. As with the Sulgrave Room, the mantelpiece is made from the Hawkins manor oak and is notably carved with an inscription that reads, "O ye fyre and heate bless ye the Lord." Behind the library paneling is a secret hidden passage, added at Alexander Weddell's request, leading to his private study. The rest of the second floor consists of living quarters and bathrooms, including many rooms of staff of the Virginia Historical Society and Virginia Weddell's bedroom, bath, and study.

== Gardens ==
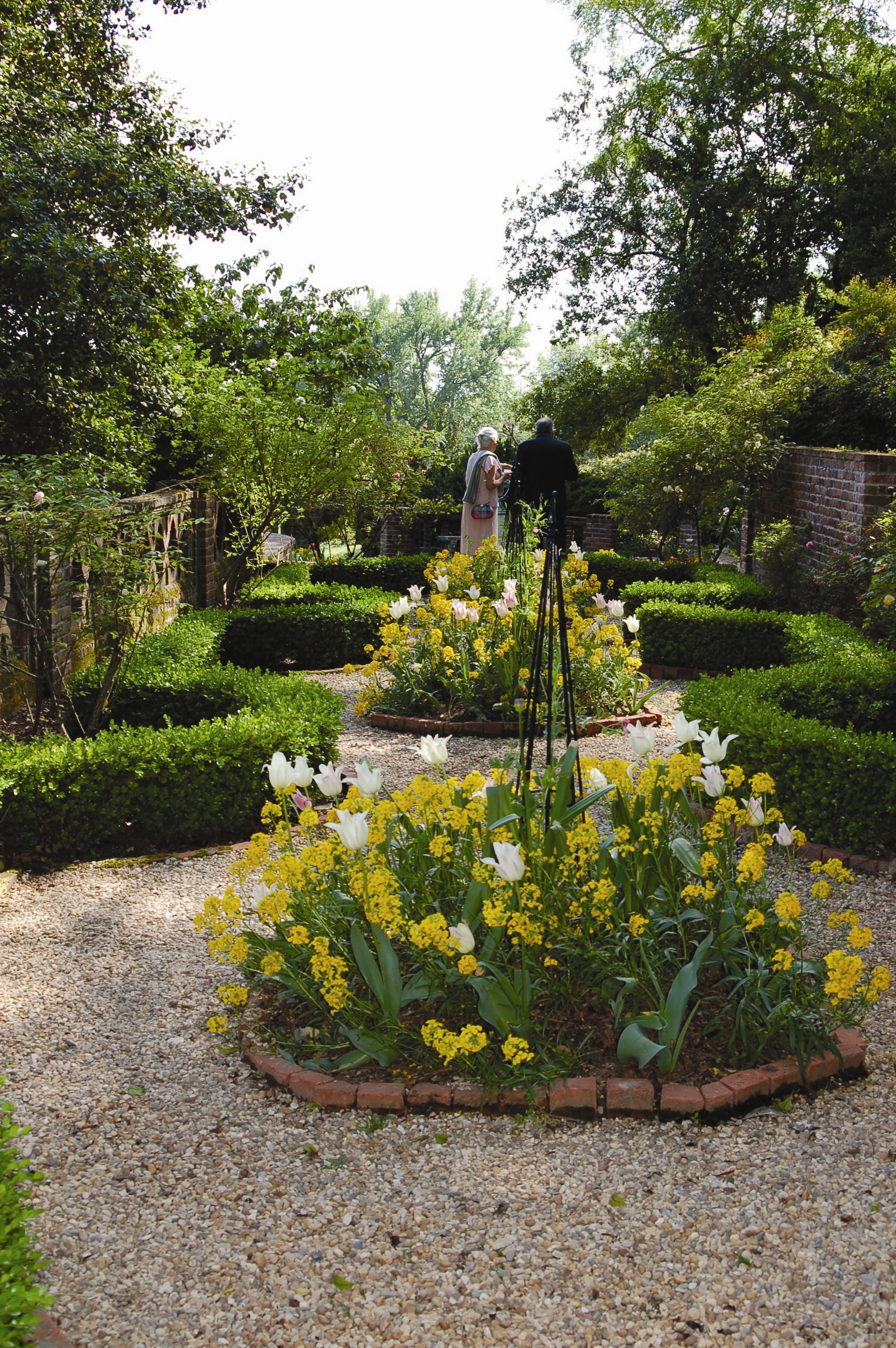
Gardens.

Virginia House is set in carefully planned landscape gardens, which contain a diversity of plants and plantings. Virginia Weddell hired the noted landscape architect Charles Gillette in 1927, and over some twenty years he built more than 8 acres (32,000 m^{2}) of scenic gardens containing close to 1,000 types of ornamental plants—from formal spring displays to wisteria, roses, and sprawling hydrangeas that drape balconies and garden rails. The first phase of the plan was to create an informal Garden Week tours are held in Virginia House gardens in the spring, attracting thousands of visitors annually.

== See also ==
- National Register of Historic Places listings in Richmond, Virginia
- Virginia Historical Society
- Lawrence Washington
- Tudor architecture
- Sulgrave Manor
