= Carlton J. H. Hayes =

American historian

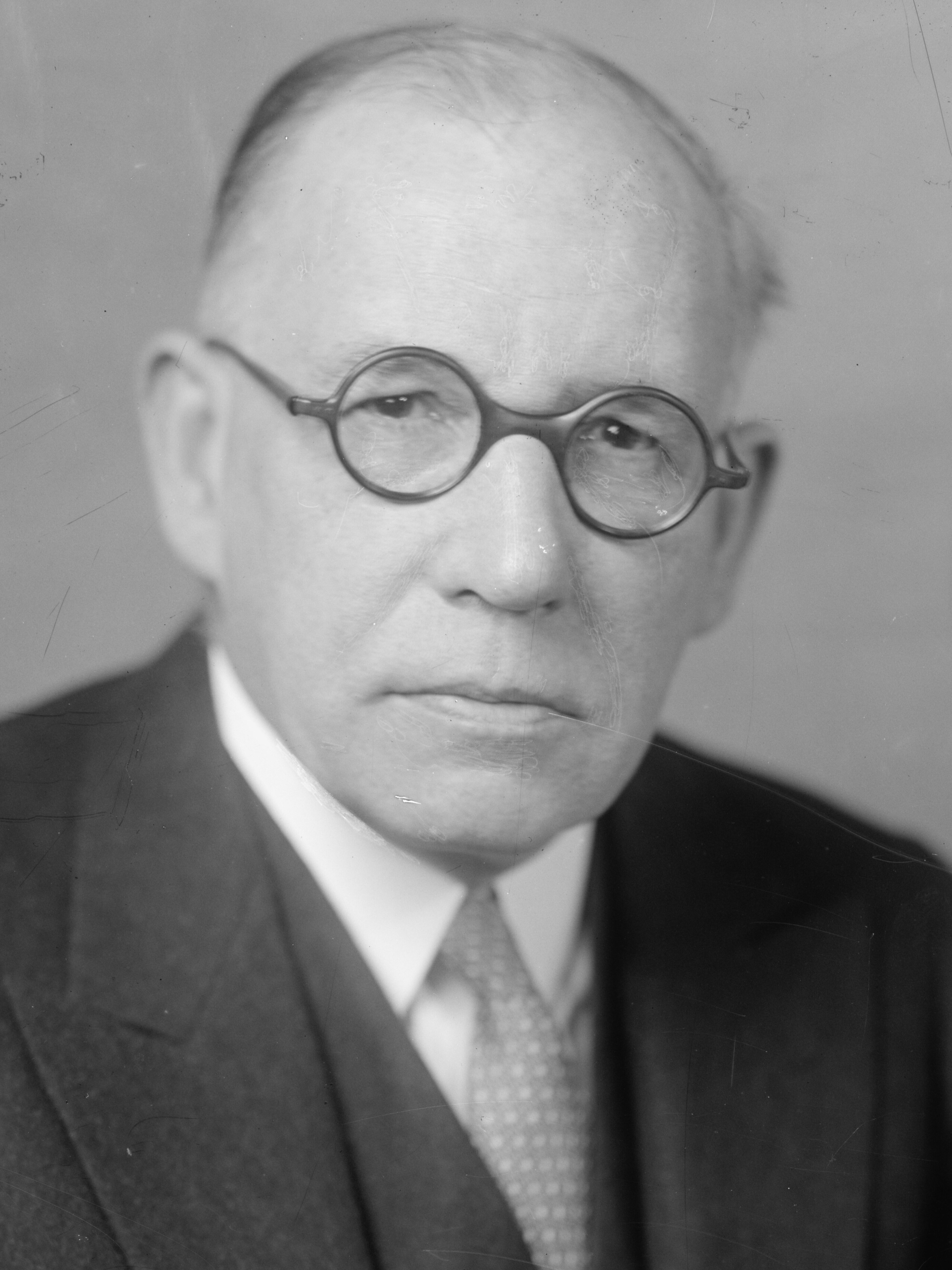

43rd United States Ambassador to Spain
- In office June 9, 1942 – January 18, 1945
- President: Franklin D. Roosevelt
- Preceded by: Alexander W. Weddell
- Succeeded by: Norman Armour

Personal details
- Born: Carlton Joseph Huntley Hayes; May 16, 1882 Afton, New York, U.S.
- Died: September 2, 1964 (aged 82) Sidney, New York, U.S.
- Spouse(s): Mary Evelyn Carroll; (c. 1920–1964; his death; 2 children)
- Education: Columbia University (B.A., Ph.D.)
- Occupation: Historian, author, ambassador, professor, academic

Military service
- Allegiance: United States
- Branch/service: United States Army
- Years of service: 1918–1919, 1928
- Rank: Major
- Battles/wars: World War I

Carlton Joseph Huntley Hayes (May 16, 1882 – September 2, 1964) was an American historian, educator, diplomat, devout Catholic and academic. A student of European history, he was a leading and pioneering specialist on the study of nationalism. He was elected as president of the American Historical Association over the opposition of liberals and the more explicit Anti-Catholic bias that defined the academic community of his era. He served as United States Ambassador to Spain in World War II. Although he came under attack from the CIO and others on the left that rejected any dealings with Francoist Spain, Hayes succeeded in his mission to keep Spain neutral during the war.

== Life and career ==
Hayes was born to a Baptist family in upstate New York, the son of Permelia Mary (née Huntley) and Philetus Arthur Hayes. He graduated from Columbia College in 1904. In 1903 he became an active member of his fraternity, Alpha Chi Rho, he remained an involved member over his lifetime. He earned his Ph.D. degree at Columbia in 1909 with a thesis on the Germanic invasion of the Roman Empire. The thesis, ""An Introduction to the Sources Relating to the Germanic Invasion," which was supervised by James Harvey Robinson, was published by Columbia University Press in 1909. He became lecturer at Columbia in European History in 1907, then was promoted subsequently to assistant professor (1910), associate professor (1915), and full professor (1919).

== Historian ==
In 1904 he converted to Catholicism, and later went on to be the first Roman Catholic co-chairman of the National Conference of Christians and Jews alongside Everett Clinchy and Roger Williams Strauss, serving as co-chairman 1928 to 1946 despite a 1928 papal encyclical which explicitly prohibited such ecumenical interactions. He was chairman of Columbia's History department several times. After World War I, he joined with Peter Guilday in establishing the American Catholic Historical Association and became its first secretary. Its goal was to promote Catholic history and to integrate Catholic scholars into the wider academic world.

Hayes was influenced by Charles A. Beard, a proponent of the "New History", which emphasized the importance of cultural economic developments as opposed to just warfare and diplomacy. Hayes argued the New History demonstrated that Original Sin was integral to human existence. His two-volume Political and Cultural History of Europe, long a major textbook, is filled with examples of such thought, none more so than his discussion of the Industrial Revolution in England. Hayes also developed the historical interpretation of nationalism and was known as the Father of Nationalism, inspiring many students to research in this field. He was an advocate of democratic social reform. His research interests shifted after 1914, and increasingly focused on nationalism, which he denounced as one of history's great evils; he said that along with imperialism and militarism, nationalism had caused World War I. Hayes was an internationalist, unlike Beard, and opposed isolationism in the 1930s while denouncing totalitarianism.

In his 1945 presidential address to the American Historical Association, titled "The American Frontier—Frontier of What?", he urged Americans to see their nation as the western frontier of Europe. The Founders had maintained "lively contacts with, and solid knowledge of, the European civilization on whose boundaries they were". In the 19th century, with massive immigration from Europe, "Americans" took a different path from Europeans, becoming a nation of diverse linguistic, religious and ethnic origins, with each group desperate to be accepted. While nationalism in Europe emerged from an appreciation for the cultural or political achievements of one's compatriots, American nationalism encouraged fresh cultural and political developments. Hayes concluded that this had produced an intense, and often artificial form of nationalism, that served to "inoculate us against Europe and built up an isolationist state of mind".

During World War I, he served at the rank of captain in the United States Military Intelligence Division of the General Staff from 1918 to 1919. Nine years later, under the direction of General Connor, the head of the War Department, he was asked to serve on an advisory committee of historians to organize documents pertaining to the American participation in the fighting in France. This earned him the title of major. In the 1930s, he was a member of the Catholic Association for International Peace. He served a term as president of the American Historical Association in 1945 and was head of the New York State Historical Association in Cooperstown. He was also a member of the American Philosophical Society.

Hayes was awarded the Laetare Medal from Notre Dame in 1946, the Alexander Hamilton medal from Columbia University in 1952, and the Gibbons Medal from The Catholic University of America in 1949. He was a guest lecturer and teacher at various academic institutions throughout his career and into his retirement and was given honorary degrees from the following institutions:

- University of Notre Dame, 1921
- Marquette University, 1929
- Niagara College, 1936
- Williams College, 1939
- Fordham University, 1946
- University of Detroit, 1950
- Georgetown University, 1953
- Michigan State University, 1955
- LeMoyne College, 1960

== Ambassador to Spain ==
From 1942 to 1945, Hayes served as US ambassador to Spain. He was attacked at the time from the left for being overly friendly with Francisco Franco, but it has been generally held that he played a vital role in preventing Spain from siding with the Axis powers during the war. Historian Andrew N. Buchanan posits that Hayes made Spain into "Washington's 'silent ally'." In 1945 President Roosevelt wrote him saying: "You have carried out a mission of great difficulty with outstanding success and in doing so you have made a contribution to the war effort of the highest importance".

Historian Emmet Kennedy rejects allegations that Hayes was an admirer of Franco. Instead he was "a tough critic of the caudillo's 'fascism'". Hayes played a central role in rescuing 40,000 refugees – French, British, Jews and others from Hitler. He helped them cross the Pyrenees into Spain and onward to North Africa. He made Spain "a haven from Hitler". In retirement, Kennedy finds, Hayes advocated patient diplomacy, rather than ostracism or subversion of Francoist Spain. That was the policy adopted by President Eisenhower as Franco led Spain into an alliance with the U.S. in the 1950s.

Historian Holly Cowan Shulman wrote:

Hayes, whom President Franklin Roosevelt appointed in March 1942, was a choice necessitated by Spanish politics. The Franco regime would not have tolerated either a non-Catholic or a liberal. Hayes was an active Catholic who believed that Franco's government should not be ideologically grouped with the Axis countries. Put more bluntly, Hayes believed that Francisco Franco was less repressive and totalitarian than either Adolf Hitler or Benito Mussolini, and that Franco could be converted into an American ally.

== Death ==
He died of a heart ailment, at Sidney Hospital, Sidney, New York on September 2, 1964, aged 82, and laid to rest at Glenwood Cemetery in Afton, New York. He was survived by his wife, Mary Evelyn (née Carroll) and their children, Mary Elizabeth Tucker and Carroll J. Hayes. His great-grandson is actor Jonathan Tucker.

== Works ==
Hayes wrote 27 books and numerous articles and book reviews. His textbooks on European history went through numerous editions and sold upwards of a million copies, making Hayes wealthy.

- Sources Relating to Germanic Invasions (1909)
- British Social Politics (1913)
- A Political and Social History of Modern Europe. Vol. I. New York: Macmillan. 1916 – via Internet Archive.; A Political and Social History of Modern Europe. Vol. II. New York: Macmillan. 1921 – via Internet Archive.
- "The History of German Socialism Reconsidered", American Historical Review (1917): 62–101. online
- Brief History of the Great War (1920)
- Essays on Nationalism (1926)
- "Contributions of Herder to the Doctrine of Nationalism", American Historical Review (1927): 719–736. in JSTOR
- Modern History, Macmillan, 1928
- Ancient and Medieval History, MacMillan Company, 1929
- France, A Nation of Patriots (1930)
- The Historical Evolution of Modern Nationalism (1931)
- A Political and Cultural History of Modern Europe, Macmillan, (2 vols. 1932–1936; rev. ed., 1939) reprint. Kessinger Publishing, LLC. 2004. ISBN 978-1-4192-0274-2.
- "The novelty of totalitarianism in the history of Western civilization", Proceedings of the American Philosophical Society (1940): 91–102. in JSTOR
- A Generation of Materialism, 1871–1900 (Rise of Modern Europe series), Harper & Brothers, 1941 excerpt
- Wartime Mission in Spain (1945) a.k.a. Wartime Mission in Spain, 1942–1945, by Carlton J.(osef). H(untley). Hayes, late American ambassador to Spain. New York, Macmillan, 1945. VIII - 313 pages. Spanish translation: ed. Epesa, Madrid, 1946.
- "The American Frontier—Frontier of What?" (Presidential address delivered at the annual meeting in Washington, D.C., on December 27, 1945), American Historical Review 50:2 (January 1946): 199–216. online
- The United States and Spain. An Interpretation. Sheed & Ward; 1ST edition. 1951. ASIN B0014JCVS0.
- The Historical Evolution of Modern Nationalism, Macmillan, 1955
- Nationalism: A Religion, Macmillan, 1960
- Contemporary Europe since 1870, Macmillan, 1965

=== Co-author ===
- Stephen Duggan, ed. (1919). The League of Nations, Principle and Practice. The Atlantic Monthly Press.
- Modern History (high-school textbook), 1929, with Parker Thomas Moon, Macmillan Company
- History of Western Civilization, 1962, with Marshall Whitehead Baldwin and Charles Woolsey Cole, Macmillan

Diplomatic posts
Preceded by Alexander W. Weddell	United States Ambassador to Spain; 1942–1945	Succeeded by Norman Armour
