= Claude G. Bowers =

American journalist and politician (1878–1958)

Claude Bowers
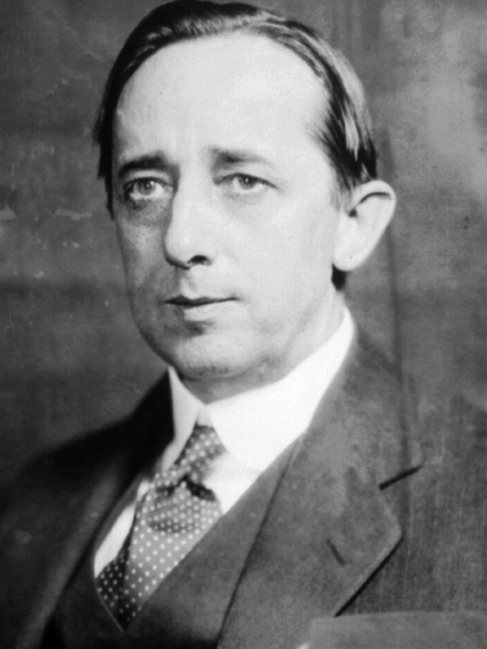

United States Ambassador to Chile
- In office September 7, 1939 – September 2, 1953
- President: Franklin D. Roosevelt; Harry S. Truman; Dwight D. Eisenhower
- Preceded by: Norman Armour
- Succeeded by: Willard L. Beaulac

41st United States Ambassador to Spain
- In office June 1, 1933 – February 2, 1939
- President: Franklin D. Roosevelt
- Preceded by: Irwin B. Laughlin
- Succeeded by: Alexander W. Weddell

Personal details
- Born: Claude Gernade Bowers; November 20, 1878 Westfield, Indiana, U.S.
- Died: January 21, 1958 (aged 79) New York City, U.S.
- Party: Democratic
- Spouse: Sybil McCaslin Bowers
- Children: Patricia Bowers
- Education: Shortridge High School
- Occupation: Newspaper writer and editor; senatorial secretary; ambassador to Spain and Chile
- Writing career
- Language: English
- Years active: 1916–1953
- Period: First half of twentieth century
- Genre: Popular history
- Subject: American politics
- Notable works: The Party Battles of the Jackson Period (1922); Jefferson and Hamilton: The Struggle for Democracy in America (1925); The Tragic Era: The Revolution after Lincoln (1929)

Claude Gernade Bowers (November 20, 1878 – January 21, 1958) was a newspaper columnist and editor, author of best-selling books on American history, Democratic Party politician, and President Franklin D. Roosevelt's ambassador to Spain (1933–1939) and Chile (1939–1953). His histories of the Democratic Party in its formative years from the 1790s to the 1830s helped shape the party's self-image as a powerful force against monopoly and privilege. Bowers was a sharp critic of Republicans and their Reconstruction era policies for African American voting rights and civil rights.

Bowers was ambassador to Spain during the Spanish Civil War (1936–1939). At first he recommended the United States join other nations in a Non-intervention Agreement. When it soon became clear that Nazi Germany and Fascist Italy, in violation of the Agreement, were openly helping the Nationalist rebels, he unsuccessfully pressed Washington to aid the government of the Spanish Republic. He left Spain when it became clear, in early 1939, that the rebels, led by the dictator Francisco Franco, had won the war. Later that year, he became U.S. Ambassador to Chile, which had a leftist government more to his liking.

In domestic affairs he considered himself a staunch Jeffersonian, and was increasingly dismayed at the New Deal interventions into the economy, but kept quiet about it.

Three of Bower's books were genuine best-sellers, "but he is little remembered today except by political historians".

== Early life and education ==
Bowers was born in Westfield, Indiana, on November 20, 1878, the son of a small-time Indiana shopkeeper, Lewis Bowers, who died when he was 12. His mother, Juliet Tipton Bowers, moved to Indianapolis, and Bowers graduated from Shortridge High School there in 1898. He was a voracious reader: "Irish oratory, English poetry, and history of all kinds were his favorite study." He demonstrated "intellectual excitement". He was a champion debater, "when debate was more important than basketball", and won the Indiana State High School Oratorical Contest with a speech on "Hamilton the Constructionist."

Finances made college impossible; even high school (not dropping out of school to work) had been a financial challenge. Beyond high school, Bowers was self-taught.

He began his career at age 21 as a journalist writing editorials for the Indianapolis Sentinel, filling in for the vacationing editorial writer, Jacob Piatt Dunn. Bowers worked as reporter and editorial writer for a variety of Indiana newspapers.

In 1903 Bowers left Indianapolis to work for the Terre Haute Gazette, and then moved to the Terre Haute Star as editorial writer. It was there that he became friends with Eugene V. Debs, head of the Socialist Party of America and repeated candidate for president and other offices on its "ticket".

At the urging of Terre Haute Representative and then Attorney General of Indiana John Edward Lamb, Bowers was chosen in 1904 as Democratic candidate for Congress for the district that includes Terre Haute. He campaigned hard but lost in a Republican landslide. He was renominated unanimously in 1904, but lost again. Though he lost, the experience polished his abundant speaking skills. He was "much in demand as a speaker". The political activity led to a "political position": he accepted an appointment to the Terre Haute Board of Public Improvements, serving unhappily from 1906 to 1911.

From 1911 to 1916 he was secretary to Senate majority leader John W. Kern. This allowed him access to leading politicians of the time, including President Woodrow Wilson. "He gained national prominence in the party." He defended the League of Nations, a principal project of Wilson. Since Kern was Democratic leader of the Senate and was absent from the office for days at a time because of caucuses, conferences, and floor strategy, Bowers did the full routine work, making him ex officio senator from Indiana. Kern was defeated in the 1916 election, and Bowers returned to Indiana and accepted a position at the Fort Wayne Journal-Gazette. Kern died in 1917 and Bowers published the following year a biography of him. Much later, Bowers published a biography of the man Kern defeated in 1910, Albert Beveridge.

Described as "an ardent Democrat", he was chairman of the Platform Committee of the Democratic Party in 1918. He declined the party's 1918 offer of the post of Indiana Secretary of State.

His book The Party Battles of the Jackson Period (1922) was well received, and led to a 1923 invitation, which he accepted, to join the editorial staff of the influential New York World, the nation's leading Democratic newspaper. When it folded in 1931, he became a political columnist for the New York Journal from 1931 to 1933.

He was a frequent public speaker, and in 1929 was described as "best known now as an orator", although "he gained first fame as a writer of historical works". He was a speechwriter for and advisor to 1928 presidential candidate Al Smith. He became a close friend of Franklin D. Roosevelt; the only book review Roosevelt ever wrote was in response to Bowers's request for a review of his 1925 Jefferson and Hamilton. "As a result of Roosevelt's lobbying", he was the keynote speaker at the 1928 Democratic National Convention. His speech was broadcast nationally by radio.

=== Ambassador ===
Bowers played a major role in Roosevelt's 1932 campaign for president; Roosevelt's overwhelming victory "virtually guaranteed Bowers some type of position in the new administration". Bowers requested appointment as ambassador to Spain, and Roosevelt was happy to choose him. While in Spain, where he was enormously popular as U.S. ambassador, and "established a reputation as 'a careful, painstaking executive,'" he continued to play an active role in the Democratic Party, as speechwriter, advisor, and publicist.

Bowers saw the Spanish peasants in Jeffersonian terms and strongly supported the leftist elected government (Second Spanish Republic). When the Spanish Civil War erupted in 1936, he at first recommended support for the non-intervention policies that were agreed to by all the European powers. However, Germany and Italy openly violated that policy, and he switched and called on Washington, unsuccessfully, to help the Republic. Bowers had little influence in Washington. Roosevelt told Bowers in 1939 that he had been right and that the US should not have remained neutral.

One of Bowers's main concerns was the safe evacuation of Americans caught in Spain by the war. In his memoir, My Mission to Spain (1954), he was highly critical of fascist agitation and strongly defended the Republic. He is responsible for the oft-repeated observation, which appeared in the subtitle of his book, that the Spanish Civil War was a dress rehearsal for World War II.

During his time as ambassador in Spain, Bowers formed a friendship with the British diplomat Geoffrey Thompson, who often offered insight into the movements of British Prime Minister Neville Chamberlain. Bowers kept Roosevelt informed of any insights that he gained about Chamberlain through Thompson.

The 1939 victory of the Nationalists, led by Francisco Franco, made Bowers's position untenable, and he was recalled from Spain. Roosevelt soon chose him as ambassador to Chile, where he remained until 1953. "He was considered among the most popular and successful envoys in Latin America despite not being a professional diplomat and not speaking Spanish."

Although disillusioned when Roosevelt's New Deal veered the country away from pristine low-budget Jeffersonian principles, Bowers held his tongue and never criticized his patron.

He died of leukemia in 1958 and is buried at Highland Lawn Cemetery in Terre Haute, Indiana. He was survived by his widow, the former Sybil McCaslin, and a daughter, Patricia Bowers.

== History books ==
Bowers wrote a series of best-selling popular histories, or "fighting popular histories", as one scholar put it. Without a college education, he did not write innovative scholarship, and he shows no knowledge of the scholarly journals containing historical research. But he read widely, including when appropriate old newspapers and archival material, and gives references in footnotes.

History was for Bowers the story of personalities, and men were either heroes or villains. This was politics. "He early interpreted American history as a contest between privilege and democracy". He was "an historian of crisis, choosing his themes from the 'critical periods' of history: the triumph of democracy over aristocracy in the Jackson period, the epochal conflict of Jefferson and Hamilton, the retrograde decade after the Civil War, the election and administrations of Jefferson, and an act from the French drama of 1789."

In a review, historian William O. Lynch, also from Indiana, described Bowers in 1929 as "close to being an able historian". But "a more restrained style, more pro and con in the discussion of problems and men, and fewer unqualified opinions would vastly improve the works of this near-brilliant author." Unsophisticated readers need "protection against writers of the school of Mr. Bowers". Lynch predicted that Bowers's "harmful" histories would not be enduring works:

"[T]he volumes of Mr. Bowers would be much sounder, live longer and do less harm, had he understood that it is not so much the business of the historian to blame and praise, as to explain political leaders. Neither is it the chief business of the historian to drive his own interpretations into the minds of his readers with the most forceful English that he can command, but instead to present the truth clearly leaving his readers free to form their own conclusions in the presence of the evidence impartially stated. Within these limits, an engaging style should not be despised but welcomed.

=== Thomas Jefferson ===
Bowers's enormously popular books Party Battles of the Jackson Period (1922) and Jefferson and Hamilton: The Struggle for Democracy in America (1925) are critical of the Federalist Party, the Whig Party, and the Republican Party as bastions of aristocracy. Jefferson and Hamilton builds on the documentary evidence and analysis of Charles A. Beard's Economic Origins of Jeffersonian Democracy. He discusses the operations of Hamilton as Secretary of the Treasury in Washington's first administration. Hamilton worked on behalf of financial speculators, including at least two dozen members of Congress, to fund depreciated debts at their full face value (to their substantial benefit and the substantial loss of the original holders of the debts), and to establish a national bank on the same basis.

After their humiliating defeat in the 1924 elections Democrats "began to pray for 'another Thomas Jefferson' to put Humpty Dumpty together again ... [In Bowers's book they found] the myth of the Democratic party masterfully recreated, ... an ideology with which they might make sense of the too often senseless conflicts of the present." When Franklin Delano Roosevelt reviewed Jefferson and Hamilton as a favor to Bowers — the only book review Roosevelt ever wrote — he began with the words: "I felt like saying 'At last' as I read Mr. Claude G. Bowers’ thrilling Jefferson and Hamilton."

Ex-Indiana Senator Albert J. Beveridge wrote a very long review of Jefferson and Hamilton, calling it "captivating". He wrote that Bowers "is master of the picturesque, which, in history and biography, is largely the human ... Mr. Bowers is frank and above board as a partisan of Jefferson, albeit an honest partisan. Moreover he tries to be fair, and he succeeds better than most special pleaders. So notwithstanding his partiality, Mr. Bowers' book is the best story of the origins of Jeffersonian Democracy that has been published."

Seven years later, Bowers published a biography of Beveridge, Beveridge and the Progressive Era (1932). Non-polemical and of high quality, many considered it to be Bowers's finest work.

In his very popular histories, he promoted the idea that Thomas Jefferson had founded the Democratic Party. (Later historians would focus on the roles of Andrew Jackson and Martin Van Buren instead.) President Franklin Roosevelt, an avid reader of Bowers and for whom Bowers's book was "a revelation", was impressed enough to build the Jefferson Memorial and appoint him the US ambassador to Spain in 1933.

=== The Tragic Era ===
Bowers is best known for The Tragic Era. The Revolution after Lincoln, his 1929 book that popularized the Dunning School's racist view of the Reconstruction era as northern oppression through civil rights legislation. While the book is now reviled by historians, it remains highly suggested among neo-Confederate websites. Additionally, the United States Supreme Court often cited the book during the early 20th century, entrenching Bowers' unfavorable view of the Reconstruction Amendments in the precedent of American law.

The Tragic Era was a regular selection of the Literary Guild book club, went through 13 printings before being reissued in paperback, and has never gone out of print. The book is also remembered for Bowers' defense of President Andrew Johnson, which historians believe was meant to revive support for the Democratic Party after Republican Herbert Hoover's landslide victory over Al Smith in the 1928 United States presidential election. This partisan endorsement reinforced Roosevelt's already favorable view of Bowers.

== Works ==
Books

- The Irish Orators: A History of Ireland's Fight for Freedom (1916)
- The Life of John Worth Kern (1918) Introduction by Vice President Thomas R. Marshall.
- The Party Battles of the Jackson Period (1922)
- Jefferson and Hamilton: The Struggle for Democracy in America (1925; German translation, 1948; Italian translation, 1955) Long review in The New York Times.
- Gerry Jr., Elbridge (1927). Bowers, Claude G. (ed.). The Diary of Elbridge Gerry Jr.; with a preface and footnotes by Claude G. Bowers. Brentano's.
- Bowers, Claude G. (1927). The Founders of the Republic. Reading with a purpose. American Library Association.
- Bowers, Claude G. (1929). The Tragic Era: The Revolution after Lincoln. Houghton Mifflin.
- Beveridge and the Progressive Era (1932)
- Jefferson in Power: The Death Struggle of the Federalists (1936)
- The Spanish Adventures of Washington Irving (1940; Spanish translation, 1946)
- The Young Jefferson, 1743-1789 (1945)
- Pierre Vergniaud: Voice of the French Revolution (1950)
- Making Democracy a Reality. Jefferson, Jackson, and Polk (J. P. Young lectures in American history, 1954)
- My Mission to Spain: Watching the Rehearsal for World War II (1954; French translation, 1956; Spanish translation, 1966; Italian translation, 1957)
- Chile Through Embassy Windows, 1939-1953 (1958; Spanish translation, 1939)
- My Life: The Memoirs of Claude Bowers (1962)
- Indianapolis in the 'Gay Nineties': High School Diaries of Claude G. Bowers, edited by Holman Hamilton and Gayle Thornbrough (1964)

Articles, columns, and speeches

- Bowers, Claude G. (February 12, 1929). "Lincoln and Douglas. Address of Hon. Claude G. Bowers of New York, Delivered at the Annual Meeting [of what is not specified] at Springfield, Ill. on February 12, 1929". Congressional Record. Vol. Seventieth Congress, no. Second session.
- Underwood, Oscar W. (1931). "Introduction, by Claude Bowers". Drifting Sands of Party Politics. The Century Company.
- Bowers, Claude G. (1943). "Jefferson and the American Way of Life". The Heritage of Jefferson. New York: Workers School. pp. 11–27.
- Bowers, Claude G. (1956). Introduction. The United States and the Spanish Civil War, 1936-1939. By Taylor, F. Jay.

Party political offices
Preceded by Pat Harrison	Keynote Speaker of the Democratic National Convention; 1928	Succeeded by Alben W. Barkley
Diplomatic posts
Preceded by Irwin B. Laughlin	United States Ambassador to Spain; 1933–1939	Succeeded by H. Freeman Matthews; Acting
Preceded by Norman Armour	United States Ambassador to Chile; 1939–1953	Succeeded by Willard L. Beaulac
