= John W. Roper =

United States Navy admiral (1898–1963)

John Wesley Roper
- Born: May 31, 1898; North Carolina, U.S.
- Died: September 8, 1963 (aged 65)
- Relatives: Daniel C. Roper (father); MG Harry M. Roper (brother)
- Military career
- Allegiance: United States
- Branch: United States Navy
- Rank: Vice Admiral
- Commands: USS Wisconsin (BB-64)
- Conflicts: World War I World War II
- Awards: Legion of Merit; Commendation Medal

John Wesley Roper (May 31, 1898 – September 8, 1963) was a Vice Admiral in the United States Navy. He was the son of the 7th United States Secretary of Commerce, Daniel C. Roper.

== Career ==
Roper was born in North Carolina and became graduate of the United States Naval Academy, Class of 1918. During World War I, he served aboard the USS Roe (DD-24), which operated in the north Atlantic, performing coastal, anti-submarine patrols, escort operations.

Later, Roper would assume command of the USS Wisconsin (BB-64) for the closing months of World War II, succeeding Earl E. Stone. During that time, he led the Wisconsin in the Battle of Okinawa. For his service during the battle, he was awarded the Legion of Merit. Previously, he had been given a Letter of Commendation for his services in the South Pacific Area, during which time he helped plan the Guadalcanal and Solomon Islands Campaigns.

John Wesley Roper died on September 8, 1963.
