= Warren Delano Robbins =

American diplomat

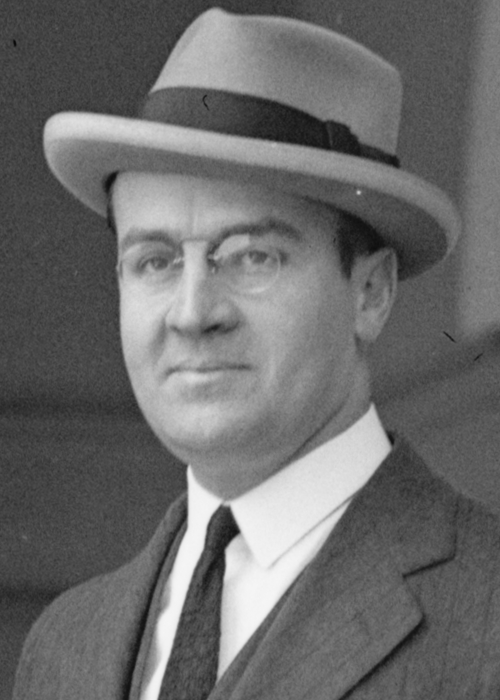

3rd Chief of Protocol of the United States
- In office September 15, 1931 – June 11, 1933
- President: Herbert Hoover
- Preceded by: F. Lammot Belin
- Succeeded by: James Clement Dunn

United States Minister to Canada
- In office May 16, 1933 – March 28, 1935
- President: Franklin D. Roosevelt
- Preceded by: Hanford MacNider
- Succeeded by: Norman Armour

United States Minister to El Salvador
- In office February 27, 1929 – April 30, 1931
- President: Herbert Hoover
- Preceded by: Jefferson Caffery
- Succeeded by: Charles B. Curtis

Personal details
- Born: Warren Delano Robbins; September 3, 1885 Brooklyn, New York, U.S.
- Died: April 7, 1935 (aged 49) Manhattan, New York, U.S.
- Spouse: Irene de Bruyn (m. 1910)
- Children: 3
- Relatives: Katharine St. George (half-sister)
- Education: Groton School
- Alma mater: Harvard University
- Awards: Order of Leopold

Warren Delano Robbins (September 3, 1885 – April 7, 1935) was an American diplomat and first cousin of President Franklin D. Roosevelt. He served as Chief of Protocol of the United States from 1931 to 1933 and as the U.S. Minister to El Salvador and United States Ambassador to Canada from 1933 to 1935.

== Early life ==
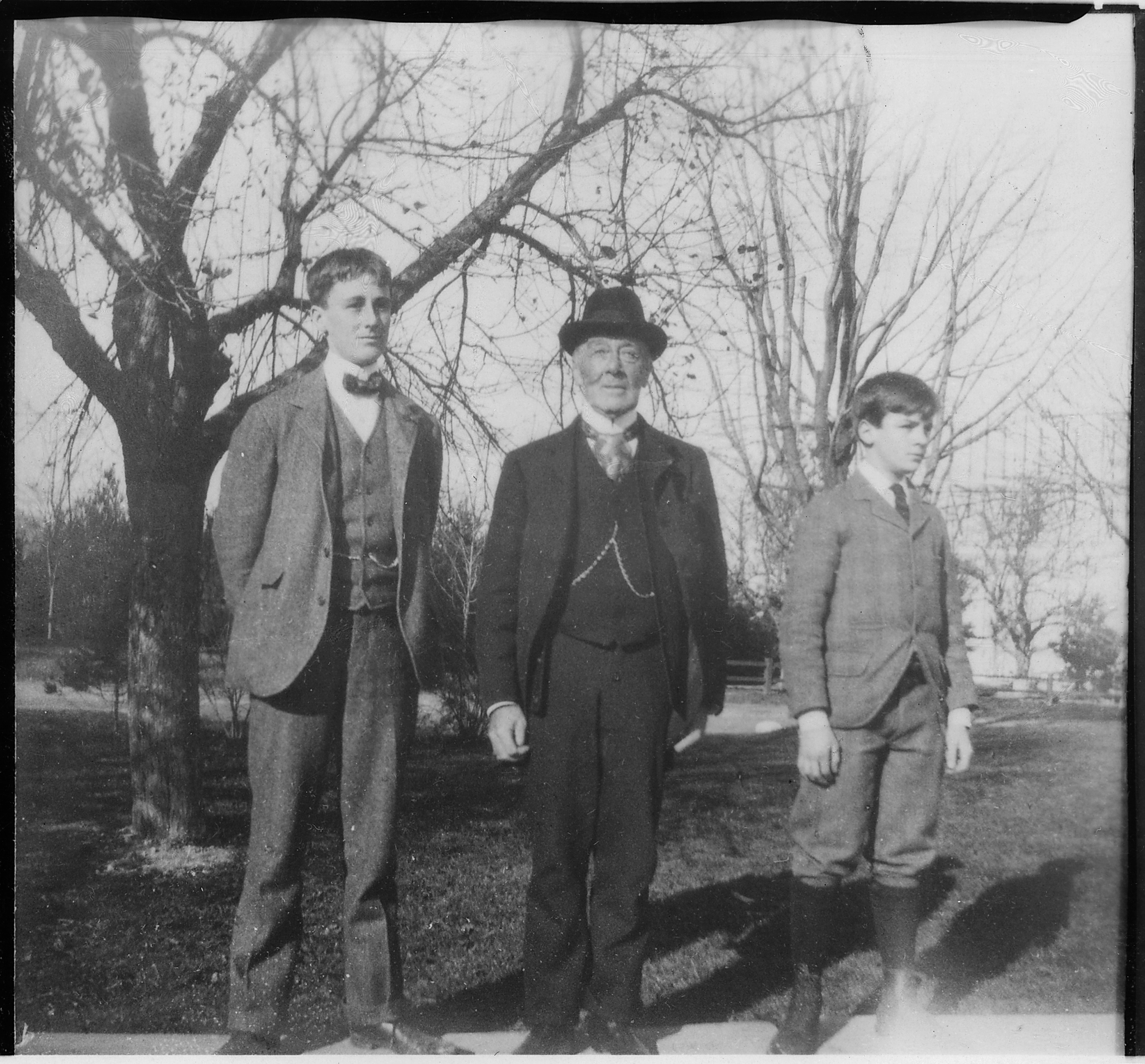
Franklin D. Roosevelt, his father James Roosevelt I, and Warren, 1899

Warren Delano Robbins was born on September 3, 1885, in Brooklyn, New York, and named after his maternal grandfather, Warren Delano Jr. He was the son of Katherine Robbins Delano (1860–1953) and Charles Albert Robbins (1854–1889). From his parents marriage, he had one sibling, sister Muriel Delano Robbins (wife of Cyril Edgar Martineau of London). (Note: At his sister Muriel Delano Robbins' 1907 wedding to Cyril Edgar Martineau (a Londoner whose family left France after the evocation of the Edict of Nantes in 1685), her brother Warren and cousin Franklin D. Roosevelt were among the ushers.) After his father's death in 1889, his mother remarried to Hiram Price Collier, a Unitarian minister, and they lived in a mansion in Tuxedo Park, New York. From his mother's second marriage, he was the older half-brother of Sara Roosevelt Collier (wife of Englishman Charles Fellowes-Gordon) and Katharine Price Collier, a Republican U.S. Representative who in 1917 married George St. George, third son of the second Sir Richard St George, 2nd Baronet.

His paternal grandfather was Daniel Robbins, one of the founders of McKesson, Robbins & Co. His maternal grandfather was a wealthy and prominent merchant who lived in China during the 1830s and he was a direct descendant of Philip Delano, a Pilgrim who arrived in Plymouth, Massachusetts, in 1621. Among his large extended family was aunt Deborah Perry Delano (wife of William Howell Forbes) uncle Warren Delano IV, aunt Sara Ann Delano (wife of James Roosevelt I), and uncle Frederic Adrian Delano.

After attending the Groton School, which was run by Rev. Endicott Peabody in Groton, Massachusetts (where his cousin Franklin, who was three and a half years older than him, also attended), he graduated from Harvard University in 1908.

== Career ==
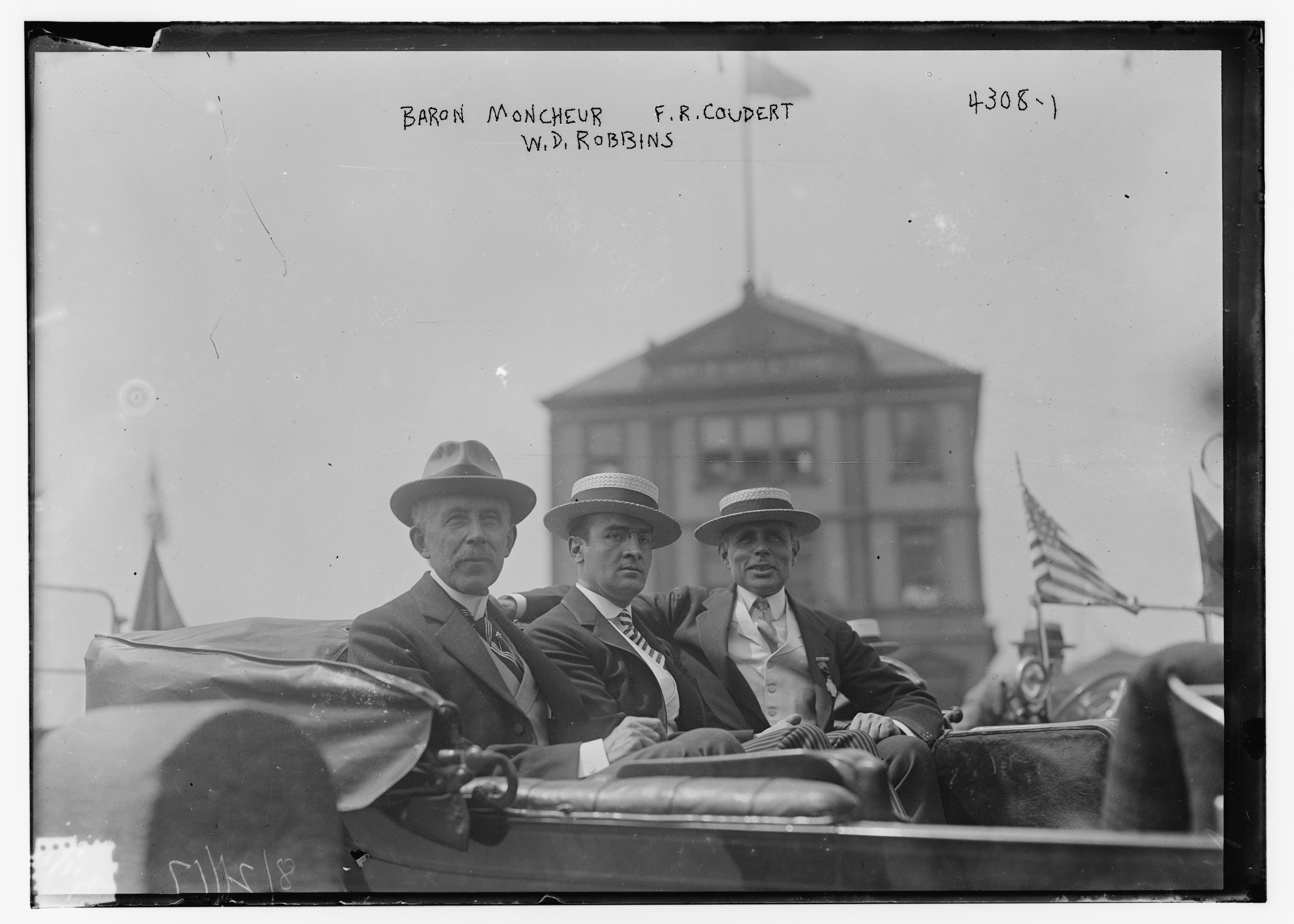
Baron Moncheur, F. R. Coudert, and Robbins

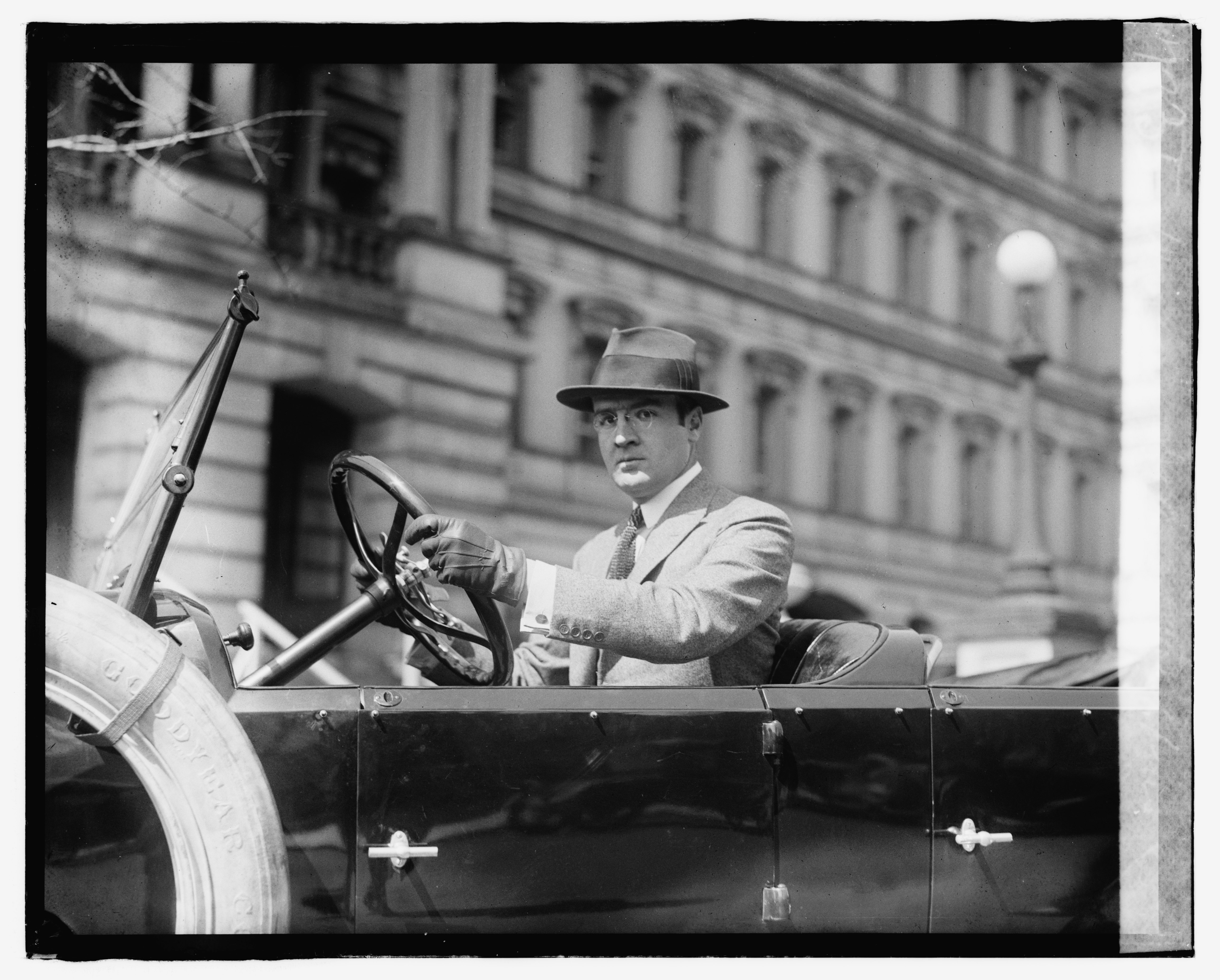
Photograph of Robbins, 1920

In 1909, Robbins began his nearly twenty-five year career with the State Department when he became a secretary on the staff of Charles Page Bryan, the United States Ambassador to Portugal. In subsequent years, he would work in a lower-level diplomatic function, including for Charles Sherrill in Argentina in 1909, France in 1911, and Guatemala in 1914. Robbins received the decoration of Chevalier de l'Ordre de Leopold from the Belgian government for the service rendered to the mission.

In 1916, he was briefly assigned to the Department of State's Division of Latin American Affairs before returning to Argentina in 1917 and then on to Chile in 1919. In 1921, he was promoted as Chief of the Division of Near Eastern Affairs, before serving in Germany (1922) and Italy (1925).

In 1929, he was elevated to Minister and given his first post as Chief of Mission, in Salvador. (The country would change its name to El Salvador while he was at that post.) In 1930, he was made a White House ceremonial officer and, in 1931, was reassigned to the State Department as Chief of Protocol of the United States. In this role, he was responsible for greeting foreign dignitaries and other ceremonial duties.

In 1933, Robbins was assigned as Chief of Mission to Canada, a position he held until shortly before his death.

== Personal life ==
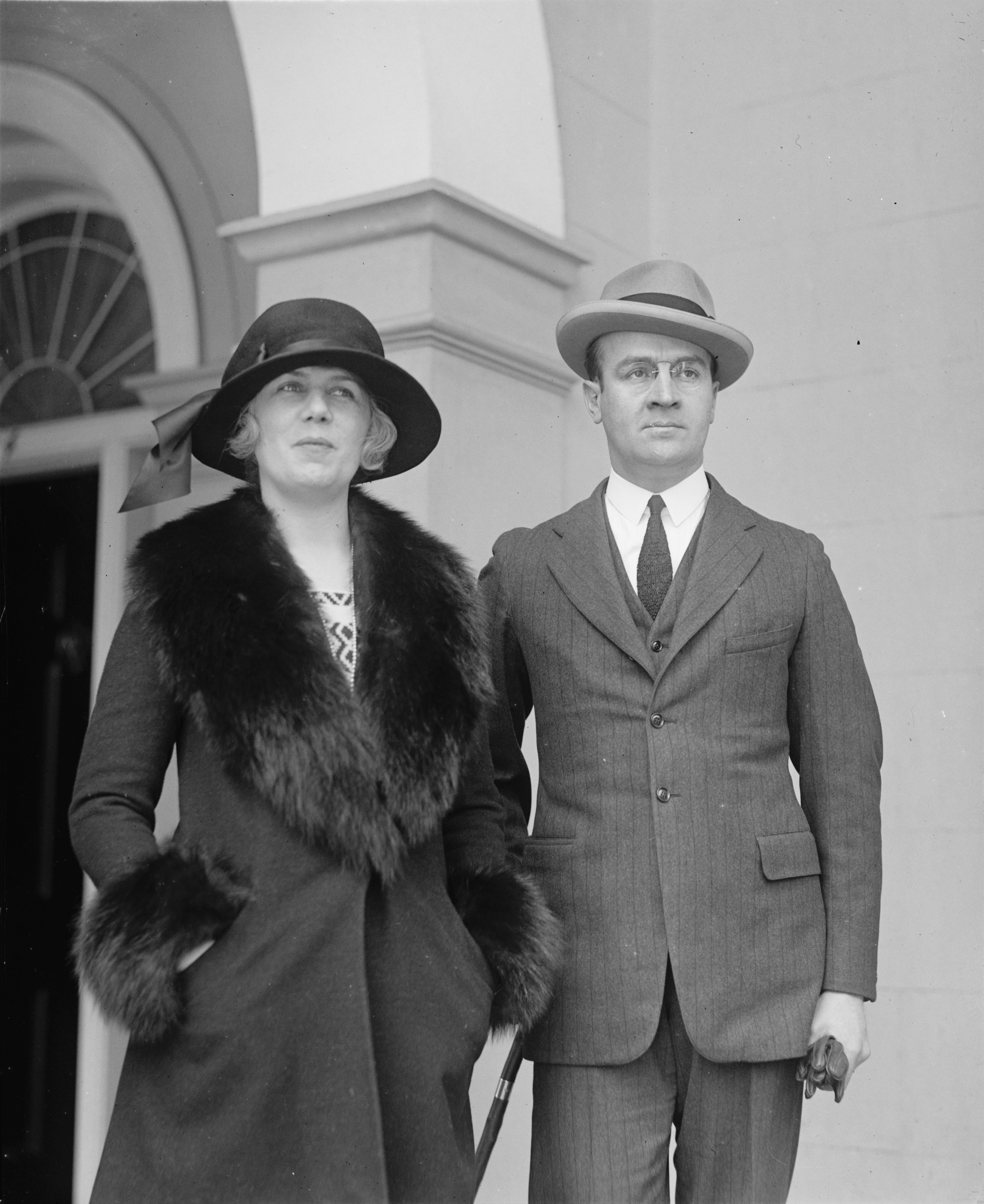
Robbins and his wife, March 1922.

On September 3, 1910, Robbins was married to Irene de Bruyn (1887–1960), a Belgian who was born and grew up in Buenos Aires, Argentina. She was a daughter of Casimir de Bruyn, banker, railroad man, and capitalist who was then the head of the Banco Franco-Argentina. Together, they were the parents of:

- Warren Delano Robbins Jr. (1911–1979), who also went into the diplomatic service and served as attaché at the U.S. Embassy in Buenos Aires.
- Edward Hutchinson Robbins (1912–1944), who married Louise Auchincloss (1914–1974), a daughter of Gordon Auchincloss (and niece of U.S. Representative James C. Auchincloss), in 1935. After his death, she married developer Allston Boyer in 1947.
- Irene Helen Robbins (1914–2000), who married Alexander Cochrane Forbes (1909–2005), a son of F. Murray Forbes (of Cabot, Cabot & Forbes) and first cousin of Alexander Cushing, in 1934.

He was a member of the Tuxedo Club, the Knickerbocker Club and the Brook Club in New York. In Washington, he was a member of the Chevy Chase Club and Riding Club.

Robbins died of pneumonia at the Doctors Hospital in New York City on April 7, 1935, aged 49. After a service at the Church of the Incarnation, he was buried at Riverside Cemetery in Fairhaven, Massachusetts. In 1936, Robbins' widow served as a special assistant at the All-American Conference for Maintenance of Peace in Buenos Aires. In 1937, Irene, an interior decorator, was appointed Assistant Chief of the State Department's Foreign Service Buildings Office, responsible for furnishing and decorating U.S. embassies, consulates and other facilities. His widow died in Hyattsville, Maryland in 1960.

=== Descendants ===
Through his eldest son, he was a grandfather of Elizabeth Robbins Hughes, Warren Delano Robbins III and Katherine Dudley Robbins.

Through his son Edward, he was a grandfather of Janet Robbins (1936–1941), who died young of polio, Edward Hutchinson Robbins (b.1940) and Gordon Auchincloss Robbins (1942–2015), a "sculptor, fly fisherman, nationally ranked board sailor and snowboarder, and coach of Olympic medalists."

Diplomatic posts
Preceded by Jefferson Caffery	United States Envoy to El Salvador; 27 February 1929–30 April 1931	Succeeded by Charles B. Curtis
Preceded by Hanford MacNider	United States Envoy to Canada; 1933–1935	Succeeded by Norman Armour
