= Warwickshire County Record Office =

Warwickshire County Record Office is the county record office for Warwickshire, England. Its purpose is to collect, preserve and make available archives relating to the history of the county and its people dating from the early 12th to the 21st century. It is located in the town of Warwick, and is owned and run by Warwickshire County Council.

== History ==
The Record Office was first founded in 1933 when it was sited in the Shire Hall. Forty years after its founding it moved to its present site, which is a purpose-built building next to Priory Park. The building was later refurbished and extended in 2002 to 2003, with two new strongrooms and improved facilities for researchers. A new conservation workshop was also provided, in an adjacent building, which is a remaining part of the original 16th/17th house on the site that was demolished (except for this small part) in 1925.

== Records held ==
Records in the County Record Office include parish registers for Warwickshire, local government records for the county, school records for the county, court records including quarter sessions and coroner's records and the records of the Warwickshire Constabulary. Several hospital archives are at the Record Office, including those of Warwickshire County Lunatic Asylum at Hatton and the former Warneford Hospital in Leamington Spa. The records of a few local firms can also be found, with many solicitors records and those of concerns like Eagle Engineering, Needle Industries Ltd and Stanley Brothers of Nuneaton.

A number of prominent local families also have records in the office including the Greville family (Earls of Warwick), the Feilding family (Earls of Denbigh), the Seymour family (Marquises of Hertford) and the Newdigate family of Arbury Hall.

== Other resources ==
In addition to the archive material kept by the record office, there are various other resources for researchers. These include a library of secondary sources relating to Warwickshire, newspapers, maps, photographs, microfilm copies of census returns for Warwickshire and microfilm copies of the GRO index (an index of the General Register Office's birth, marriage and death certificates).

== Other record offices with Warwickshire material ==
The Warwickshire County Record Office is not the only repository holding archives relating to Warwickshire. Many of the records for certain areas of the historic county of Warwickshire are held by other record offices.

Other archives that hold records relating to the historic county of Warwickshire include:

- Birmingham Archives and Heritage – holds records for the Birmingham area
- Coventry History Centre – holds records for the City of Coventry
- Shakespeare Centre Library and Archive – holds many of the records relating to the Stratford-upon-Avon area
