= Katharine St. George =

American politician (1894–1983)

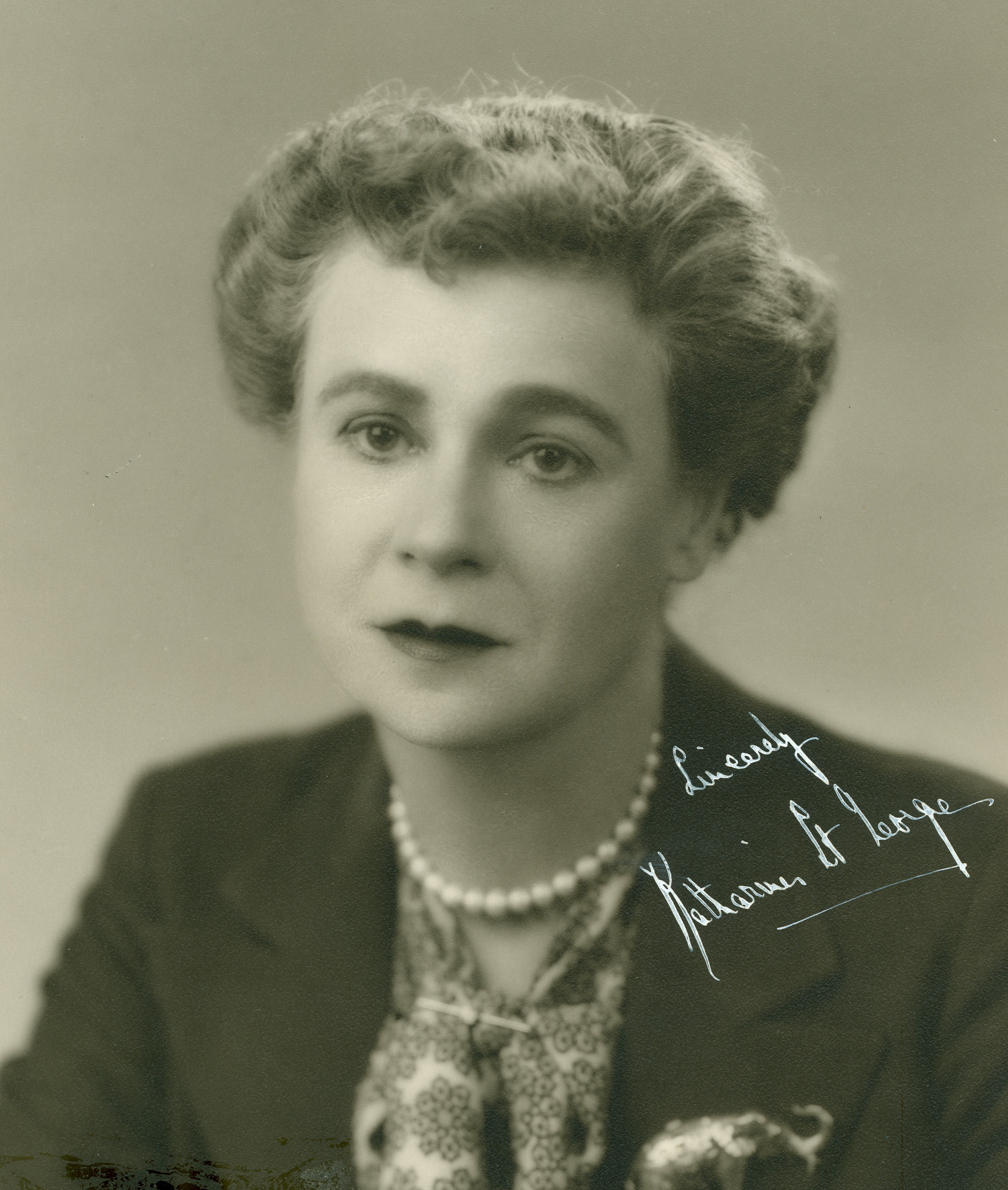

Member of the U.S. House of Representatives from New York
- In office January 3, 1947 – January 3, 1965
- Preceded by: Augustus W. Bennet
- Succeeded by: John G. Dow
- Constituency: 29th district (1947–53); 28th district (1953–63); 27th district (1963–65)

Personal details
- Born: Katharine Price Collier; July 12, 1894 Bridgnorth, England
- Died: May 2, 1983 (aged 88) Tuxedo Park, New York, U.S.
- Resting place: St. Mary's-in-Tuxedo Episcopal Church Cemetery, Tuxedo Park, New York, U.S.
- Party: Republican
- Spouse: George Baker Bligh St. George (m. 1917; died 1957)
- Children: 1
- Relatives: Warren Delano Robbins (half-brother); Franklin D. Roosevelt (cousin)

Katharine Price Collier St. George (July 12, 1894 – May 2, 1983) was a Republican member of the United States House of Representatives from New York, and a cousin of President Franklin Delano Roosevelt.

== Early life and family ==
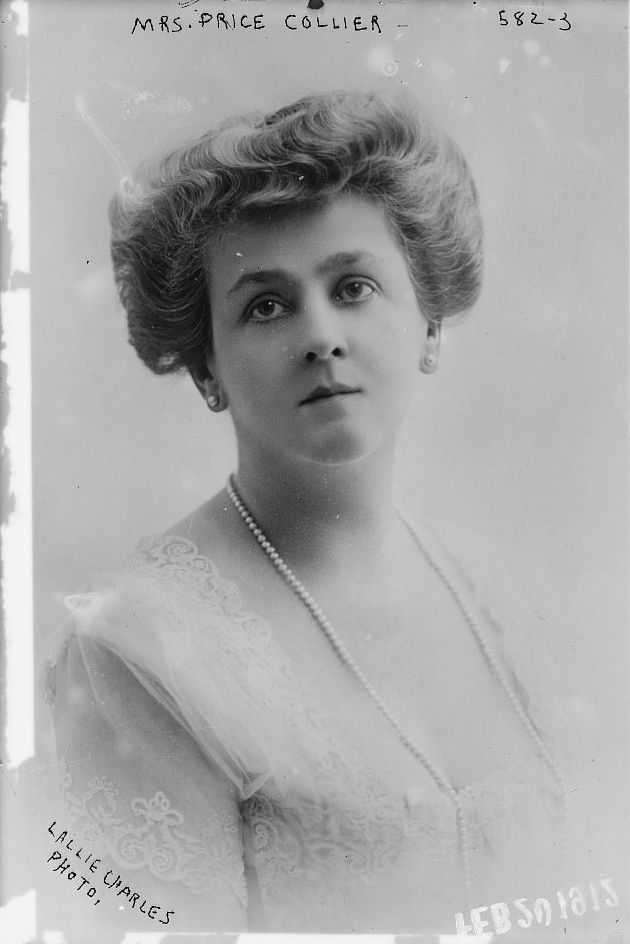
Mrs. Price Collier, portrait bust, Lallie Charles Photo

St. George was born in Bridgnorth, England, in 1894, to American parents. Her family returned to the United States when she was two years of age. Her father, Hiram Price Collier, was a former Unitarian minister. Her mother, Katharine Delano Collier, was the younger sister of Sara Delano Roosevelt, mother of President Franklin Delano Roosevelt. St. George's younger sister, Sara Collier, was named in their aunt's honor. From her mother's first marriage to Charles Albert Robbins, she was younger half-sister of diplomat Warren Delano Robbins.

== Career ==
She was a member of the town board of Tuxedo Park, New York, from 1926 until 1949. She was chair of the Orange County Republican committee from 1942 until 1948. She was a delegate to the 1944 Republican National Convention. She was elected to Congress in 1946 and served from January 3, 1947, until January 3, 1965.

St. George challenged the incumbent Rep. Augustus Bennet in the 1946 Republican primary winning 53%. Bennet, however, had been elected in 1944 as the Democratic, American Labor, Liberal, and Good Government nominee against thirteen-term Republican Rep. Hamilton Fish. Bennet had run twice before against Fish in Republican primaries and caucused with Republicans in the House. Fish, an extreme opponent to the United States involvement in the Second World War, had been disavowed by Republican New York Gov. Thomas E. Dewey. St. George had supported Fish and he returned the favor in her 1946 primary and election campaigns. After handily winning renomination in 1948 in a primary with Fish concerns, she did not face another opponent for renomination. The November elections were more challenging but unthreatening until 1964. In 1956 she drew Pulitzer Prize-winning cartoonist Bill Mauldin, the creator of GIs Willie and Joe, whose celebrity did not move the needle. The year 1964, however, brought Republican presidential nominee Barry Goldwater, opposed for nomination by New York Gov. Nelson Rockefeller and rejected by Republican Sen. Kenneth Keating and candidate for reelection. Her district voted against Goldwater by 25 points and against St. George by three points.

St. George was a power in the House. She became the New York member of the Committee on Committees that made Republican committee assignments, voting the large number of New York Republican representatives. In her last two terms she served on the critical Rules Committee. Nine enacted public bills were sponsored by her. Session after session she introduced the Equal Rights Amendment, not proposed by Congress until she was eight years gone.

A proponent of pay equity, St. George was a supporter of the Equal Pay Act of 1963. In 1962, St. George proposed that legislation be passed to ensure that women received equal pay for equal work. Her proposals were drafted into a bill and introduced by Congresswoman Edith Green, an Oregon Democrat. During a debate regarding the bill, St. George stated that opposing the bill was comparable to "being against motherhood".

The bill met with stiff opposition from the United States Chamber of Commerce, but received support from the Kennedy Administration, the American Association of Women, the National Consumers League, the ACLU, and the AFL-CIO.

The bill passed in both the House and the Senate, but it passed in different forms, and there was no final bill. Undaunted, in 1963, Green re-introduced the bill, and this time it was successfully signed into law.

St. George voted in favor of the Civil Rights Acts of 1957, 1960, and 1964, as well as the 24th Amendment to the U.S. Constitution.

== Personal life ==
Katharine married George Baker Bligh St. George, third son of the second Baronet St. George (see St George Baronets) and grandson of George Fisher Baker. They were the parents of one daughter:

- Priscilla St. George, who married first to Angier Biddle Duke (1915–1995), an American diplomat, and an heir to the Duke tobacco empire, from 1936 to 1940; and second to State Senator Allan A. Ryan, Jr. (1903–1981) from 1941 to 1950.

St. George and her family resided briefly at 2144 Wyoming Avenue in Washington D.C. before relocating to Tuxedo Park, New York, in June 1919, where she much later died at the age of eighty-eight, in 1983.

== See also ==
- Women in the United States House of Representatives

U.S. House of Representatives
Preceded by Augustus W. Bennet	Member of the U.S. House of Representatives from New York's 29th congressional district 1947–1953	Succeeded by J. Ernest Wharton
Preceded by Ralph A. Gamble	Member of the U.S. House of Representatives from New York's 28th congressional district 1953–1963	Succeeded by J. Ernest Wharton
Preceded by Robert R. Barry	Member of the U.S. House of Representatives from New York's 27th congressional district 1963–1965	Succeeded by John G. Dow
