= Windsor Farms =

- Neighborhood of Richmond
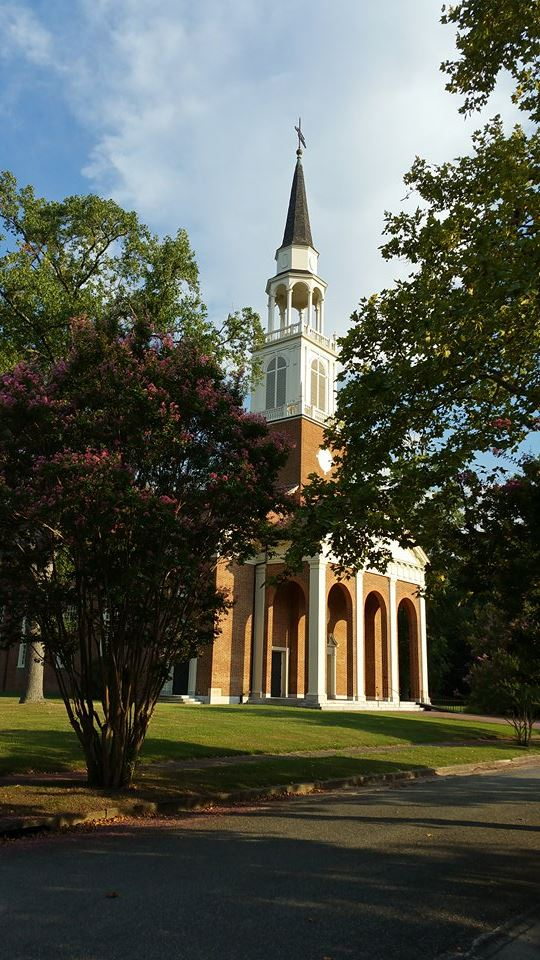
- Interactive map of Windsor Farms
- Coordinates: 37°33′20″N 77°29′54″W
- Country: United States
- Subdivision: Lockgreen
- Subdivision: Rothesay
- Established: 1926

Government
  - President: Trent Kerns (Board of Directors)

Population (2013)
  - Total: 1,383
- Time zone: UTC−04:00 (Eastern Daylight Time)
  - Summer (DST): UTC−05:00 (Eastern Standard Time)
- ZIP code: 23221
- Area code: 804
- ISO 3166 code: 1
- Website: windsorfarms.org

Windsor Farms is a 20th-century neighborhood in Richmond, Virginia, of primarily Colonial Revival design.

Designed in 1926, Windsor Farms is one of Richmond's earliest planned neighborhoods, modeled after an English village, with winding streets and English-inspired names like Dover, Canterbury, Berkshire, and so on. There are a variety of architectural styles, the most prevalent being Colonial Revival and Cape Cod. Lots range from half an acre to 23 acres (93,000 m^{2}). Windsor Farms has several historical buildings, notably Virginia House and Agecroft Hall. Its Farms borders are described by Cary Street Road to the north, the Downtown Expressway to the east, the James River and several areas to the south, and the neighborhoods of Lockgreen and Westmoreland Place to the west.

Historic houses in the neighborhood include Virginia House and Agecroft Hall, both moved from England in the 20th century. Another is "The Oaks" which was built by Benjamin Harrison IV in 1745 and moved from nearby Amelia County, Virginia, in 1927.

Several high-end, architecturally significant houses were designed by Virginia-born Duncan Lee and William Lawrence Bottomley of New York.

== Architecture ==
Like most of the Greater Richmond Region, Windsor Farms showcases an emphasis of Colonial Revival architecture and Tudor architecture. This influence is notably seen in two historical homes in the neighborhood: Virginia House and Agecroft Hall. Virginia House was originally constructed in England in the 16th century prior to the existence of colonial Virginia. At the time of Windsor Farms' construction, the house was auctioned off and transported to the Atlantic Ocean.

== Layout ==
Windsor Farms was one of the first communities in Richmond built with the automobile in mind. Its layout features a partial grid that is characterized by curvy roads, with one major road encircling the neighborhood. Dover road, is a divided revenue which serves as the main thoroughfare that connects the eastern and western ends of the community together. The street allows east-west access to neighboring communities such as Stadium, Rothesay, Lockgreen, and Near West End. Canterbury Road functions as the primary ring road for the neighborhood. Exeter Road provides direct access to Carytown while Coventry Road offers direct access to Mary Munford.

At the heart of the community lies the 'Grace Baptist Church' and the "Church Green", which serves as a center meeting place for the residents.
