= Priory Park, Warwick =

Park in Warwick, England

Coordinates: 52.2852°N 1.5845°W

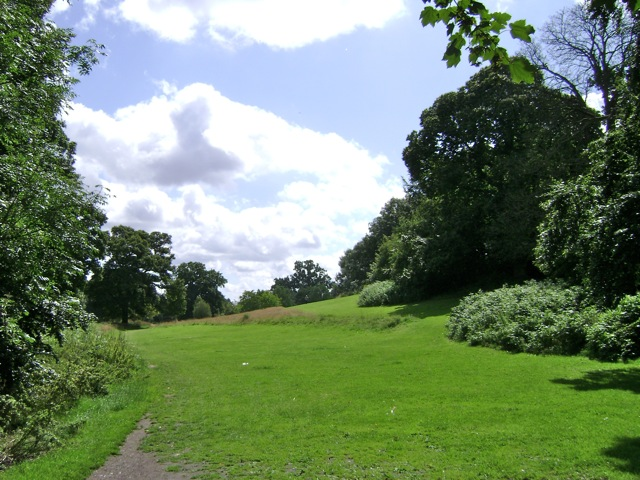
A section of the current park

Priory Park is an urban park located in the centre of Warwick, England. Originally the land was the grounds of a 12th-century priory dedicated to St Sepulchre and built in 1124 but this was closed down by King Henry VIII during the dissolution of the Monasteries. It was then destroyed and a residential home was built in 1566 by a man named Thomas Fisher known as Hawkins. In the 17th century, the estate was owned by Sir Thomas Puckering, 1st Baronet and his heirs, including Sir Henry Puckering, 3rd Baronet who was MP for Warwickshire and then the borough of Warwick.

By 1850 the property had been taken over by the famous Warwickshire family, the Wises. During that year the Great Western Railway company were allowed to build an embankment to extend the line to Warwick station which was built in 1852 at the north-east of the estate. In 1926 Alexander W. Weddell, an American diplomat and his wife Virginia, a wealthy woman in her own right, purchased the property after seeing the advertisement that Priory House was to be demolished. They bought the house and shipped several thousand tons of the stones and other materials for the building of Virginia House, Richmond, Virginia in 1928. They signed the house to the Virginia Historical Society who still maintain it today. http://www.vahistorical.org/your-visit/virginia-house

The estate now is owned and managed by Warwick District council and is a public park. (Part of the park is owned by Warwickshire County Council but managed by WDC) There is very little evidence of the previous buildings in existence. In 1958 and 1979 there were international scout gatherings at the park and a plaque by one of the paths commemorates this. The AMIKARO referred to on the plaque means Friendship in Esperanto. Seven trees were planted, although 3 of these have since died and replaced in 2012, to spell AMIKARO.

In the 1970s Warwickshire County Council moved its record offices to the eastern part of the estate into a purpose built building. The public park area is composed of unimproved grass areas that are cut but not landscaped and there are many clumps of trees to explore. Until the late 1990s there was a small children's play area in the middle but this was removed. The nearest play area can be found a minute's walk north west from the park under the railway bridge in a smaller 5-acre (20,000 m^{2}) park called Priory Pools. Because there are many burrows around the park European rabbits are a common sight, even to the casual observer. The total public area of the main park currently stands at 28.7 acres.

Famous artists have visited the park; Canaletto in the 1740s and in 1809 John Constable made a sketch. A painting by a Pre-Raphaelite artist John Brett was auctioned in 2018.

A free leaflet has been published which is both a nature and history walk around the Park and Priory Pools. Available at Warwick Tourist Information Centre, Jury Street, Warwick (with effect from February 2016) and also online.
