= Augustus W. Bennet =

American politician

Augustus Witschief Bennet
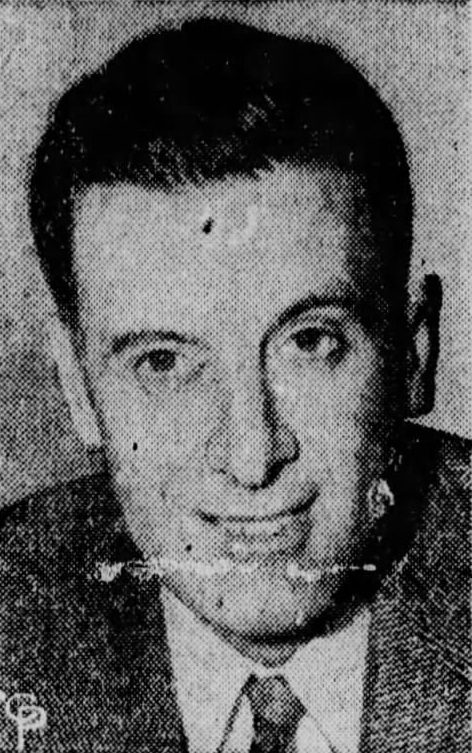

Member of the U.S. House of Representatives from New York's 29th district
- In office January 3, 1945 – January 3, 1947
- Preceded by: Dean P. Taylor
- Succeeded by: Katharine St. George

Personal details
- Born: October 7, 1897 New York City, US
- Died: June 5, 1983 (aged 85) Concord, Massachusetts, US
- Party: Republican
- Spouse: Maxine Layne Bennet
- Education: Amherst College; Columbia University Law School
- Profession: lawyer; politician

Military service
- Allegiance: United States
- Branch/service: Naval Reserve Flying Corps
- Years of service: June 8, 1918, to January 19, 1919
- Rank: Chief
- Unit: quartermaster
- Battles/wars: World War I

Augustus Witschief Bennet (October 7, 1897 – June 5, 1983) was an American politician and a United States representative from New York.

== Biography ==
Bennet was a son of U.S. Representative William Stiles Bennet and Gertrude (Witschief) Bennet. He attended the public schools in New York City and Washington, D.C., and graduated from Amherst College in 1918.

During the First World War, Bennet served in the United States Naval Reserve Flying Corps with the rating of chief quartermaster from June 8, 1918, to January 19, 1919. He graduated from the Columbia University Law School at New York City in 1921, was admitted to the bar the same year.

== Career ==
Bennet commenced practice in Newburgh. He was United States referee in bankruptcy from 1923 to 1944, and was married to Maxine Layne on October 19, 1929.

Elected as a Republican to the Seventy-ninth Congress, Bennet was U. S. Representative for the twenty-ninth district of New York and held that office from January 3, 1945, to January 3, 1947. He was an unsuccessful candidate for renomination in 1946.

== Death ==
Resuming the practice of law, Bennet resided in Laguna Hills, California, until he died in Concord, Massachusetts, on June 5, 1983 (age 85 years, 241 days). He was cremated, and his ashes are interred at Cedar Hills Mausoleum, Newburgh, New York.

== General Reference ==
- Augustus Bennet Papers, 1935-1948. M.E. Grenander Department of Special Collections and Archives, University Libraries, University at Albany, State University of New York (hereafter referred to as the Augustus Bennet Papers).

U.S. House of Representatives
Preceded by Dean P. Taylor	Member of the U.S. House of Representatives from New York's 29th congressional district January 3, 1945, to January 3, 1947	Succeeded by Katharine St. George
