= Norman Armour =

American diplomat (1887–1982)

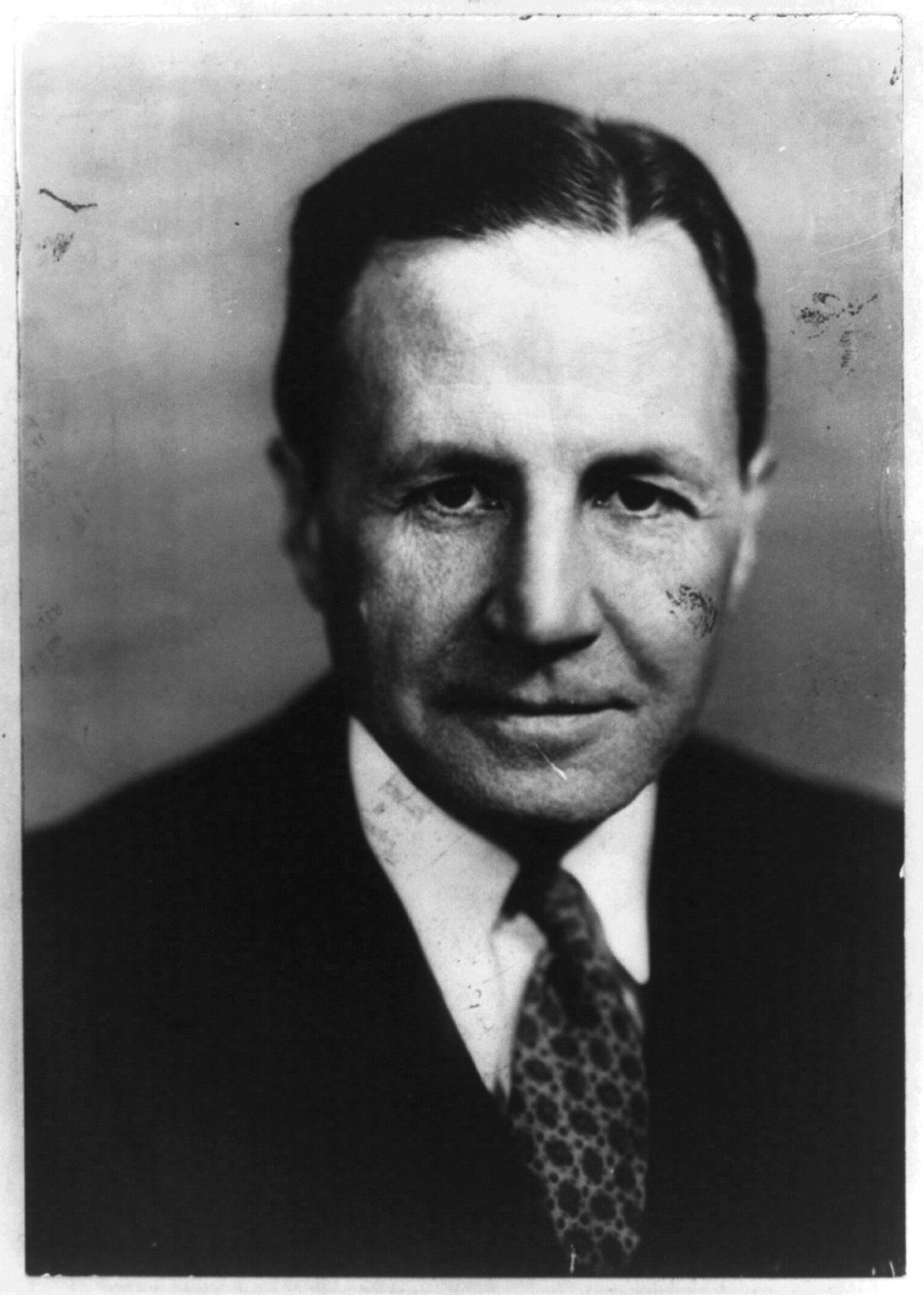

United States Ambassador to Haiti
- In office July 25, 1932 – March 21, 1935
- President: Herbert Hoover; Franklin D. Roosevelt
- Preceded by: Dana G. Munro
- Succeeded by: George A. Gordon

United States Ambassador to Canada
- In office August 7, 1935 – January 15, 1939
- President: Franklin D. Roosevelt
- Preceded by: Warren Delano Robbins
- Succeeded by: Daniel Calhoun Roper

United States Ambassador to Chile
- In office April 21, 1938 – June 10, 1939
- President: Franklin D. Roosevelt
- Preceded by: James B. Cunningham
- Succeeded by: Claude G. Bowers

26th United States Ambassador to Argentina
- In office May 18, 1939 – June 29, 1944
- President: Franklin D. Roosevelt
- Preceded by: Alexander W. Weddell
- Succeeded by: Spruille Braden

44th United States Ambassador to Spain
- In office December 15, 1944 – December 1, 1945
- President: Franklin D. Roosevelt; Harry S. Truman
- Preceded by: Carlton J. H. Hayes
- Succeeded by: Stanton Griffis

United States Ambassador to Venezuela
- In office December 7, 1950 – October 2, 1951
- President: Harry S. Truman
- Preceded by: Walter J. Donnelly
- Succeeded by: Fletcher Warren

United States Ambassador to Guatemala
- In office October 18, 1954 – May 9, 1955
- President: Dwight D. Eisenhower
- Preceded by: John Emil Peurifoy
- Succeeded by: Edward J. Sparks

Personal details
- Born: October 14, 1887 Brighton, England
- Died: September 27, 1982 (aged 94)
- Resting place: Princeton Cemetery, Princeton, New Jersey
- Party: Democratic Party
- Spouse: Myra Sergueievna Koudashev
- Education: Princeton University; Harvard Law School

Norman Armour (October 14, 1887– September 27, 1982) was a career United States diplomat whom The New York Times once called "the perfect diplomat". In his long career spanning both World Wars, he served as Chief of Mission in eight countries, as Assistant Secretary of State for Political Affairs, and married into Russian nobility. He was the United States Ambassador to Canada, Haiti, Chile, Argentina, Spain, Venezuela, and Guatemala.

== Career ==
Armour was born in Brighton, England, while his parents were vacationing there. He grew up in Princeton, New Jersey, and graduated from St. Paul's School, and from Princeton University in 1909. In 1913, he graduated from Harvard Law School, before returning to Princeton to study diplomacy. His first posts were to Austria in 1912 and France from 1915 to 1916 before formally entering the Foreign Service.

=== Russia ===
One of his first assignments in the Foreign Service was as Second Secretary in the United States embassy in Petrograd in the Russian Empire, beginning in 1916 (during World War I). After the collapse of Czarist Russia, the Bolsheviks seized control of the government and signed the Treaty of Brest-Litovsk with the Central powers, which marked their exit from World War I. (These events precipitated the Russian Civil War which would lead to the formation of the Soviet Union in 1922.) Prior to the formal signing of the treaty, the United States partially evacuated their embassy, but Armour remained as part of the limited staff. On July 25, the Russian authorities ordered the diplomats out of Petrograd and a new legation was set up in Vologda. The North Russia Campaign, an Allied Intervention in the Russian Civil War, further destabilized the situation and resulted in the legation becoming essentially under siege. (The Russian army had already attacked the British consulate and killed its Attache.) At this point, the order of events for Armour becomes somewhat unclear.

According to news reports of the time, Armour was arrested and brought back to Moscow, where he and other Americans (diplomats and otherwise) were allowed to flee the country on August 26, by train to Sweden, arriving on September 5. Later, it was revealed that Armour had during this period used a fake Norwegian passport and, disguised as a courier, sneaked back into Petrograd and arranged for Princess Myra Koudashev of Petrograd to escape the country. Contrary to the contemporary reports, his obituary in the New York Times also says that he did not travel in the refugee train from Moscow, but rather escaped himself to Finland, still disguised as a courier, where he caught up with them.

On November 2, shortly after they arrived back in the United States, the two announced their engagement. They were married February 2, 1919 in Brussels, Belgium.

=== Russian background of Mrs. Armour ===
Née Myra Sergueievna Koudashev, Mrs. Armour was a daughter of a first marriage of Tatar Prince Serguey Vladimirovich Kudashev, to a Russian Countess of the Nieroth family, being born in Saint Petersburg, 7 April 1895.

Over the following years, diplomat Armour served in a number of embassies and consulates, including those in Belgium, The Netherlands, Uruguay, Italy, the United States Department of State (1922–1924), Japan (1925–1928), and France (1928–1932).

=== France ===
In 1929, after the death of Myron T. Herrick on March 31, 1929, Armour was made Chargé d'affaires and Head of the Embassy in Paris until the selection of a replacement. This was Armour's first time as Chief of Mission. He was also an extremely popular social figure in France and he and his wife were often written about in American newspapers, flaunting the Parisian high life.

=== Haiti ===
In 1932, Armour was assigned as Minister to Haiti in the Caribbean. His primary responsibility was to work toward returning the government of the country to native hands at the conclusion of the United States occupation of Haiti. The Occupation had been in effect since July 1915 when U.S. Marines landed at Port-au-Prince. He was selected for the position due to his fluency in French, but also as a sign to the Haitians that the United States would put a well-respected diplomat in their country. On August 7, 1933, Armour signed a treaty with Haitian Foreign Minister, Albert Blanchett in which the U.S. agreed "to return government functions to the Haitians by October 1944 and to withdraw the United States Marines stationed there by November 1944." The plan succeeded ahead of schedule, as the Marines left the country on August 14, 1934.

=== Canada ===
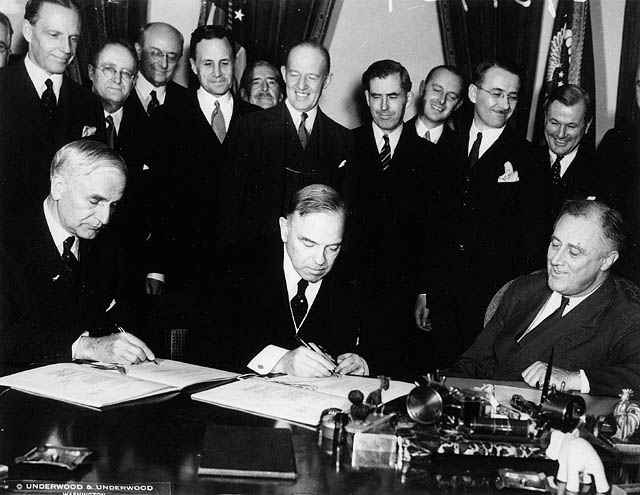
Armour, behind Prime Minister Mackenzie King during the signing of the United States-Canada Trade Agreement in 1935.

After the death in office of Warren Delano Robbins, Armour was made Minister to Canada. His appointment to Canada so soon after his success in Haiti was meant to underscore Canada's importance to the United States, according to the New York Times.

During his time in Canada, the State Department banned marriages between diplomatic personnel and the citizens of foreign countries they served due to potential conflict of interest problems. Though there were at this time 122 diplomats who had taken foreign wives, Armour's high-profile relationship with his highborn Russian wife and the way in which they were engaged were commonly cited by the press on both sides of the issue.

=== Chile and Argentina ===
In 1938, Armour was appointed as Ambassador to Chile, was a post in which he served relatively uneventfully.

The following year, he was appointed as Ambassador to Argentina, as the Second World War was heating up. During this period, Armour worked to negotiate better trade relations with these South American countries, and, once the United States entered the war, to apply pressure on them to not support the Axis powers. One of the provisions of the treaty that he helped negotiate essentially cut off the supply of tungsten, essential for steels in armored tanks and in electrical lamps, to Japan from Argentina. Imports from that country to Japan accounted for half of that country's supply. However, Argentina refused to budge off key issues and remained ostensibly neutral.

In 1941, Armour was made honorary director of the first Pan-American Games, which were to be held in 1942, but were called off due to the war.

Near the end of the war, on January 26, 1944, Argentina finally caved to pressure from Britain and the United States and broke ties with the Axis powers. However, almost immediately after this, General Edelmiro Julián Farrell seized power in a coup from President General Pedro Pablo Ramírez.

Both generals closely backed General Juan Domingo Perón, their successor from June 1946 to July 1974, who was president in three different periods: 1946–1952; 1952–1955 until a military coup ousted him; and from September 1973, after 18 years in exile, to 1 July 1974 when he died.

As a result of this turmoil, the United States refused to recognize the legitimacy of the new government. Armour was ordered to remain in Argentina, but not to officially establish relations of any kind with the new government until a list of conditions were met. The United States officially suspended relations with the country on March 3, 1944, believing that the coup was backed by pro-Axis groups. Armour was officially recalled on June 27, 1944.

After his recall, Armour was made acting Chief of the Department of Latin American Affairs, now probably integrated under the Bureau of Western Hemisphere Affairs in the State Department, until his appointment the following year, on 15 December 1944, to Spain, presenting his credentials three and a half months later, on March 24, 1945.

== Spain and retirement ==
In Spain, Armour continued to apply pressure on the government of Francisco Franco due in part to its support of the Axis powers during the Second World War. On his retirement on November 29, 1945 (formally, 1 December 1945), only 8 months afterwards, the United States further isolated Spain by refusing to send another ambassador until 1951.

A resolution of the United Nations, document 32(I) 9 February 1946, commended General Franco's regimen, stating:

... the actual Spanish Government, founded through the help of the powers of the Axis, not possessing, in view of his origins, nature, historical and the intimate association with the agreeing States, the conditions justifying his admission ...

in Spanish:

. ... El actual gobierno español, el cual habiendo sido fundado con el apoyo de las potencias del Eje, no posee, en vistas de sus orígenes, su naturaleza, su historial y su íntima asociación con los Estados agresores, las condiciones que justifiquen su admisión.

During the period from December 1945 to March 1951, the U.S. embassy remained open with a succession of Chargé d'Affaires, namely Philip W. Bonsal from March 1946 to June 1947, Paul T. Culbertson from June 1947 to December 1952, and Stanton Griffis.

The later Chargé d'Áffaires was appointed on February 1, 1951, again as an Ambassador Extraordinary and Plenipotentiary presenting his credentials on March 1, 1951, just one month after his appointment, but he relinquished the charge on January 28, 1952, 11 months later.

In 1947, Armour came out of retirement to serve as Assistant Secretary of State of Political Affairs under George C. Marshall. On July 15, 1948, he retired for a second time. In 1950, Armour was asked out of retirement again to serve as Ambassador to Venezuela. In 1954, he came out of retirement again to serve as Ambassador to Guatemala, a post he only served in for seven months.

According to an interview in 1976, Armour indicated that he was proudest of his work in 1954, protesting Joseph R. McCarthy's attacks on the members of the Foreign Service who were suspected of connivance with communism during the ongoing Cold War, in his February 9, 1950 Wheeling Speech on Lincoln Day to the Republican Women's Club of Wheeling, West Virginia.

With a Russian wife, no matter whether she was an exiled Tsarist times aristocrat descending from Tatar Princes settled at the Saint Petersburg corridors of power centuries before, there were grounds for deep suspicions, and as a Catholic member of the Democratic Party under Democrat Presidents Franklin D. Roosevelt and Harry S. Truman.

Armour died in 1982 and was buried in Princeton Cemetery.

Diplomatic posts
Preceded by Myron T. Herrick	United States Chargé d'Affaires ad interim, France; 1929	Succeeded by Walter E. Edge
Preceded by Dana G. Munro	United States Minister to Haiti; 1932–1935	Succeeded by George A. Gordon
Preceded by Warren Delano Robbins	United States Minister to Canada; 1935–1938	Succeeded by Daniel C. Roper
Preceded by Hoffman Philip	United States Ambassador to Chile; 21 April 1938–10 June 1939	Succeeded by Claude G. Bowers
Preceded by Alexander W. Weddell	United States Ambassador to Argentina; 19 June 1939–29 June 1944	Succeeded by Spruille Braden
Preceded by Carlton J. H. Hayes	United States Ambassador to Spain; 1945	Succeeded by Stanton Griffis
Preceded by Walter J. Donnelly	United States Ambassador to Venezuela; 7 December 1950–2 October 1951	Succeeded by Fletcher Warren
Preceded by John Peurifoy	United States Ambassador to Guatemala; October 18, 1954 – May 9, 1955	Succeeded by Edward J. Sparks
