= Alexander W. Weddell =

American diplomat (1876–1948)

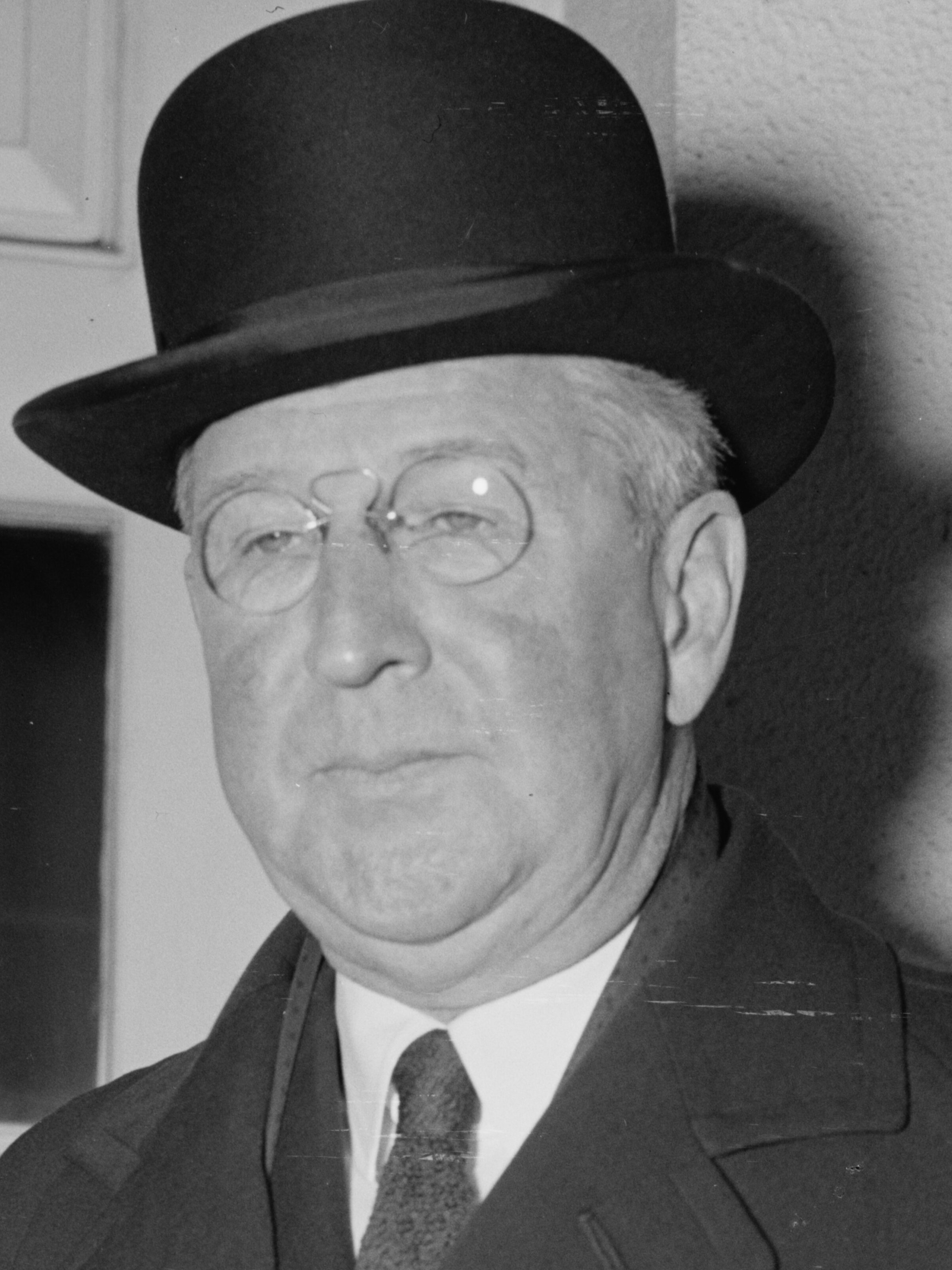
- Weddell in 1938

42nd United States Ambassador to Spain
- In office June 15, 1939 – February 7, 1942
- President: Franklin D. Roosevelt
- Preceded by: Claude G. Bowers
- Succeeded by: Carlton J. H. Hayes

25th United States Ambassador to Argentina
- In office September 18, 1933 – October 29, 1938
- President: Franklin D. Roosevelt
- Preceded by: Robert Woods Bliss
- Succeeded by: Norman Armour

Personal details
- Born: April 6, 1876 Richmond, Virginia, U.S.
- Died: January 1, 1948 (aged 71) Otterville, Missouri, U.S.
- Resting place: Hollywood Cemetery; Richmond, Virginia, U.S.
- Spouse: Virginia Steedman (m. 1923)
- Education: George Washington University

Alexander Wilbourne Weddell (April 6, 1876 – January 1, 1948) was an American diplomat. He served as United States ambassador to Argentina from 1933 to 1939 and to Spain from 1939 to 1942.

Weddell was born in Richmond, Virginia, and attended George Washington University. On May 31, 1923, he married a wealthy widow, Virginia Chase Steedman. He served as president of the Virginia Historical Society from 1943 until his death.

Weddell was the author or editor of several books, including:

- A Memorial Volume of Virginia Historical Portraiture (1930)
- Richmond, Virginia, in Old Prints (1932)
- Introduction to Argentina (1939)
- Portraiture in the Virginia Historical Society (1945)

Weddell married Virginia (née Chase) Steedman, wife of James Harrison Steedman, in 1923. Weddell and his wife died in a train accident near Otterville, Missouri, on January 1, 1948. He and his wife were buried in Hollywood Cemetery in Richmond.

== Virginia House ==
The Weddells' Richmond home, Virginia House, was constructed from material from an older house located in Priory Park, Warwick, England. He purchased the Warwick property in 1926 and transported it over two years later. The rebuilt house now belongs to the Virginia Historical Society and is open to the public.

Diplomatic posts
Preceded by Robert Woods Bliss	United States Ambassador to Argentina; 1933–1938	Succeeded by Norman Armour
Preceded by Claude G. Bowers	United States Ambassador to Spain; 1939–1942	Succeeded by Carlton J. H. Hayes
