= Lockgreen =

Coordinates: 37.558578°N 77.513802°W

- Neighborhood of Richmond
- Interactive map of Lockgreen
- Country: United States
- State: Virginia
- City: Richmond
- Built: 1987
- Time zone: UTC−04:00 (Eastern Daylight Time)
  - Summer (DST): UTC−05:00 (Eastern Standard Time)
- ZIP code: 23226
- Area code: 804
- ISO 3166 code: 1

Lockgreen is an upper-class gated community located in Richmond, Virginia's West End. The neighborhood lies within Wilton and is served by Lockgreen Circle. Lockgreen was built as an extension to Windsor Farms's Old Locke subdivision. The zip code for the subdivision is 23226.

== History ==
Lockgreen is one of the newer communities constructed in the city of Richmond, with the first homes being built in the late 1980s. The community was intended to contain multimillion-dollar mansions as demand for upper class housing in the city of Richmond grew.

== See also ==
- Neighborhoods of Richmond, Virginia
- West End (Richmond, Virginia)
