= List of genealogy databases =

This is a list of genealogy databases and online resources that are not specifically restricted to a particular place, family set, or time period in their content.

== List for general purposes ==
Project	Description
Ancestry.com	For-profit genealogy company. Databases include Find a Grave, RootsWeb, a free genealogy community, and Newspapers.com.
Archives.gov	US National Archives and Records Administration. Free online repository with a section dedicated to genealogical research
BALSAC	Population database of Quebec, Canada
Cyndi's List	Thousands of resource links, categorized and cross-referenced
Familypedia	Free cooperative family history wiki using Semantic MediaWiki
FamilySearch	Images and indexes developed by the Church of Jesus Christ of Latter-day Saints
Find a Grave	Online database of cemetery records (over 152 million burial records and 75 million photos)
Findmypast	The largest website for digitalized and transcribed British records
Fold3	Online repository, formerly known as Footnote, focusing on military records; owned by Ancestry.com
FreeBMD	Index of births, marriages and deaths (BMD) for England and Wales from 1837 to 1983
Genealogica	Online database of the historical population of Romania, with a family history wiki using MediaWiki
Geneanet	French genealogical website of more than 3 million members and some digitized archival records
Geni.com	Large genealogy website most notable for its work to compile a singular "world family tree" that connects all volunteers. Was purchased by MyHeritage, but continues to operate independently.
GENUKI	Information covering the British Isles
Library and Archives Canada	Official archives of Canada, census records, government records, books, newspapers, images, and more
MyHeritage	Aggregated search system and genealogy databases, claims to have over 20 billion records.
National Archives of Ireland	The official repository for the state records of Ireland including census records, wills and administrations, plus other genealogy records
New England Historic Genealogical Society	America's oldest genealogical society, provides education and research resources with over 1.4 billion records
Rodovid	Global genealogy in many languages, genealogy wiki
Serbian Genealogical Society	Online database with surnames, locations and background information
TheGenealogist	Records mainly covering the British Isles
Trackuback	Online context based genealogy visualization including cultural timeline and old maps
WeRelate	Genealogy wiki and sourced collaborative, referenced place index, sponsored by Allen County Public Library and the Foundation for On-Line Genealogy
GEDmatch	For comparisons of autosomal DNA data files from different testing companies. Used by law enforcement to identify suspects.
WikiTree	Free genealogy community dedicated to building a worldwide family tree accessible to everyone
Reclaim The Records	Non-profit group dedicated to publishing records that are restricted using laws and the public domain.
Clan and Family Database of Japan	Genealogical Institute of Japan dedicated to building a Japanese clan and family tree database

== Comparison of notable databases for uploading family trees ==
Some of these also have social networking features.

Web site	Alexa traffic rank as of 2015	Free features	Features for subscribers
Ancestry.com	457	Multilanguage user interface.; Some records are free for anyone to access, but the majority are accessible only by paid subscription.	Subscriber benefits vary by subscription class.
FamilySearch	2471	All features free; Some records can only be accessed at a FamilySearch local office or through a library membership account.	—N/a
Geneanet	9814	Multilingual user interface.; View historical records.; Searching in other users trees.; Uploading of scanned documents and photos.; Access to referenced genealogical place index.; Access to referenced source index.; Connecting trees made by different users by suggested matches; Add your family tree (unlimited size).	Family name alerts; Access to a library of 3 billion people; Tree comparisons.
Genes Reunited	64853 (1795 GB)	Add your family tree (unlimited size).; Forums and message boards.	View historical records.; Send messages to other members.; View other members' trees.
Geni.com	6114	Social network.; Web based editing of own network.; Downloading of GEDCOM files.; Tree view is only shown to users that have logged in.	Searching in other users' trees.; Connecting trees made by different users.; Collaborative editing of friends' trees.
MyHeritage	4214	Multilingual user interface.; Connecting trees made by different users by suggested matches; Limit of 250 individuals in tree	Limit of 2500/unlimited individuals in tree depending on plan; Timeline and Timebook
Rodovid	217,138	Wiki based social network.; Web based editing of own network.; Multilanguage user interface.; Searching in other users trees.; Connecting trees made by different users.; Collaborative editing.; Uploading of scanned documents and photos.; Access to referenced genealogical place index.; Access to referenced source index.; Email notification of updates on watched pages.	—N/a
Trackuback		Uploading of GEDCOM files; Simultaneous visualization of all ancestors in family tree; Geography window with modern map; Timeline with personal information; Tools for editing your genealogy at basic level	Uploading of scanned documents and photos; Automatic geotagging of places for events; Advanced search in familytree; Timeline with cultural content; Old maps and historical sites; Wiki based information
WeRelate	203,422 (38022 US)	Wiki based social network.; Web based editing of own network.; Up and downloading of GEDCOM files.; Searching in other users trees.; Connecting trees made by different users.; Collaborative editing.; Uploading of scanned documents and photos.; Access to referenced genealogical place index.; Access to referenced source index.; Email notification of updates on watched pages.; Duplicate and common ancestor matching	Donation-supported
WikiTree	20,423 (8755 US)	Wiki based social network.; Web based editing of own network.; Uploading and downloading of GEDCOM files.; Collaborative editing.; Uploading of scanned documents and photos.; Duplicate and common ancestor matching.; Email notification of updates on watched pages.; Individually managed privacy settings for each profile.	—N/a

== See also ==
- Family History Research Wiki, handbook reference information and educational articles showing how to find ancestors
- GEDCOM
