= SGS =

SGS, Sgs, or sgs may refer to:

== Acronym usage ==
- ISO 639-3 code for the Samogitian dialect
- ISO 3166 trigram for South Georgia and the South Sandwich Islands
- FAA location identifier for South St. Paul Municipal Airport

== Companies and organizations ==
- SGS S.A. (formerly Société Générale de Surveillance), a Swiss company providing inspection, verification, testing and certification services
- SGS-ATES (Società Generale Semiconduttori – Aquila Tubi E Semiconduttori), a former Italian company now merged into STMicroelectronics
- SGS/SCN, regional television stations in Australia
- SGS Essen, a German multi-sports club
- Saudi Geological Survey, the national geological survey of the Kingdom of Saudi Arabia
- Serbian Genealogical Society, a learned society that is engaged in genealogical research
- Sisters of the Good Samaritan, a Roman Catholic congregation of religious women
- Styling Garage, a German automobile tuner and coachbuilder active in the 1980s

== Entertainment ==
- Sahaba of Greater Sahel, a fictional African Islamist terrorist group in season 5 of SEAL Team (TV series)
- Search Guard Successor Foundation, a fictional organization in the Japanese Super Sentai show GoGo Sentai Boukenger
- Super Girl Seven, the protagonists of Supergirl (Japanese TV series)

== Education ==
=== Schools ===
- St. George's School (disambiguation), various locations

==== England ====
- Slough Grammar School, in Berkshire
- South Gloucestershire and Stroud College, in Gloucestershire
- Spalding Grammar School, in Lincolnshire
- Stafford Grammar School, in Staffordshire
- Steyning Grammar School, in West Sussex
- Stockport Grammar School, in Stockport
- Stretford Grammar School, in Greater Manchester
- Sutton Grammar School, in South London
- Sale Grammar School, in Sale, Trafford council

==== Elsewhere ====
- Seattle Girls' School, in the U.S. state of Washington
- Sligo Grammar School, in County Sligo, Ireland
- Sydney Grammar School, in Sydney, Australia
- Suva Grammar School, in Suva, Fiji

=== Universities ===
- University of Toronto School of Graduate Studies, Ontario, Canada

== Science and technology ==
- Samsung Galaxy S, a series of Android smartphones
- Satellite ground station, a terrestrial radio station designed for extraplanetary telecommunication with spacecraft
- Schweizer SGS, a series of gliders manufactured by Schweizer Aircraft
- Strong generating set, a concept in the group theory of mathematics
- Sulforaphane glucosinolate, a chemical compound

== Other ==
- Shadow Government Statistics, former name of the Shadowstats.com website
- Showgrounds railway station, Melbourne
- Silicone gel sheeting
- South Georgia Survey, four expeditions (1951–1957) led by V. Duncan Carse which mapped the South Georgia Antarctic archipelago
- Śūraṅgama Samādhi Sūtra, an early Mahayana sutra of Indian origin
