= Shadow government =

Shadow government may refer to:

== Government ==
- An opposition grouping in a parliamentary system that mimics the structure of the actual government, in particular its cabinet (see shadow cabinet)
- A term for plans for an emergency government that takes over in the event of a disaster, see continuity of government
- A government-in-exile
- Shadow government (conspiracy), a conspiracy theory of a secret government

== Arts and entertainment ==
- Shadow Government, a 2009 film by Cloud Ten Pictures
- "The Shadow Government", a song on the 2007 album The Else by They Might Be Giants
- "The Shadow Government", a sketch on the former radio show Morning Sedition
- The Shadow of Government, 2007 novel by Saudi writer Mundhir al-Qabbani

== See also ==
- Government-in-exile – Governing body located outside its claimed territory
- Deep state (disambiguation)
- Shadow Government Statistics (Shadowstats.com), a website that offers alternatives to U.S. government economic statistics
- Smoke-filled room
