= National Institute of Statistics and Censuses of Argentina =

Argentina's statistics and census agency

Coordinates: 34°36′36″S 58°22′30″W

National Institute of Statistics and Censuses
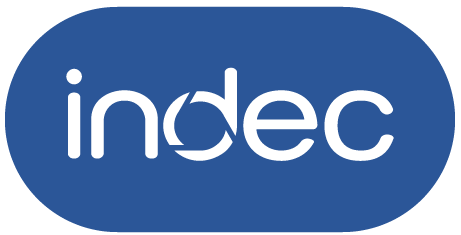

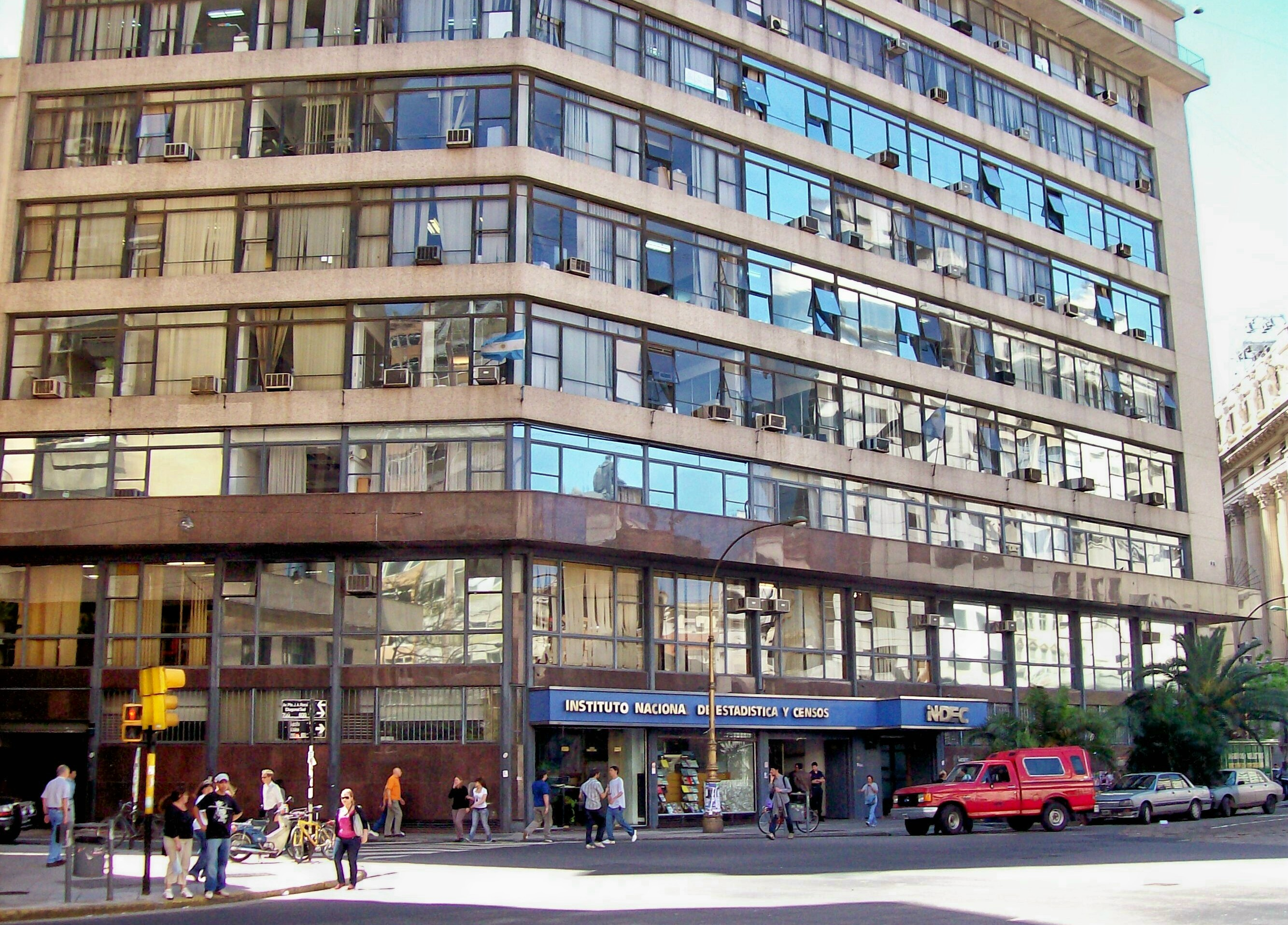
- INDEC headquarters in Buenos Aires

Agency overview
- Formed: 1968; 58 years ago
- Preceding agency: National Council of Statistics and Censuses (Argentina)
- Headquarters: Buenos Aires, Argentina
- Employees: 3,941 (Dec 2023)
- Agency executive: Marco Lavagna, Director
- Parent agency: Ministry of Economy
- Website: indec.gob.ar

The National Institute of Statistics and Censuses (Spanish: Instituto Nacional de Estadística y Censos, mostly known by the acronym INDEC) is an Argentine decentralized public body that operates within the Ministry of Economy, which leads all official statistical activities carried out in the country.

In February 2013, the International Monetary Fund (IMF) censured Argentina for failing to report accurate inflation data. Political intervention in the INDEC figures ended, and the IMF declared in November 2016 that Argentine statistics were again in accordance with international standards.

== Definition ==
The INDEC is a public deconcentrated body, of a technical nature, within the scope of Argentina's National Ministry of Economy, and which runs all the official statistical activities carried out throughout the country.

Its creation and operation are regulated by Law 17622, executive orders 3110/702 and 1831/933, and INDEC Provision 176/99. It is a deconcentrated entity within the scope of the Ministry of Treasury of Argentina.

INDEC produces statistical information on Argentina, which can be used by governments for public policy planning. It can also be used for research and projections in the academic and private fields.

Citizen and stakeholder cooperation and contribution of primary data are fundamental in statistical production. Individual data are confidential and are protected by statistical confidentiality established in Law 17622, and results are always published as statistics. Release dates are informed in the annual advance calendar, available on the Institute's web page.

== Duties ==
INDEC's duties are established in Law 17622, section 5: to implement a statistical policy for the Argentine State; to give structure to National Statistical System (NSS) and lead it; to design statistical methodologies for statistical production; to organise and run statistical infrastructure operations; and to produce basic indicators and social, economic, demographic and geographic data.

== Structure ==
INDEC has a pyramid hierarchy. Resolution 426-E/20176 "empowers the minister of Treasury, following the involvement of the Undersecretary of Public Employment Planning of the Ministry of Modernisation, to approve the lower organisation structure up to 28 directorates and 15 coordinating units."

In May 2017, the structure of the Institute was redesigned and confirmed by Administrative Resolution 3057 of the Office of the National Chief of Cabinet. The new organisation structure provided for the inclusion, standardisation, reassignment and recognition of the national and general directorates and their corresponding responsibilities and actions, and created the position of Managing Director.

The Management Directorate leads the National Directorate of the National Statistical System, the General Directorate of Administration and Operations, the General Directorate of Human Resources and Organisation, the Informatics Directorate, and the Legal Affairs Directorate.

The Technical Directorate, also under the General Directorate, is in charge of the National Directorate of Statistical Methodology, the National Directorate of National Accounts, the National Directorate of International Accounts, the National Directorate of Statistics and Prices of Production and Trade, the National Directorate of External Sector Statistics, the National Directorate of Social and Population Statistics, and the National Directorate of Living Conditions Statistics.

The new structure also includes the National Directorate of Dissemination and Communication, in charge of "leading and conducting specific communication programmes designed around various public objectives"; and the National Directorate of Planning and Institutional and International Relations, which "draws and updates the Institute's international relations map, establishing and initiating those which are key to the strategic plan." They are both directly under the Institute's General Directorate.

== Coordination of the National Statistical System ==
INDEC coordinates the operations of the National Statistical System (NSS) under the principles of regulatory centralisation and executive decentralisation; produces the Annual Programme of Statistics and Censuses; and develops methodologies and rules to ensure data comparability between different sources.

The NSS includes INDEC and the central statistical bodies (under ministries, secretariats of State, commands of the Armed Forces, decentralised organisations of the national administration, and decentralised organisations of State companies) and peripheral statistical bodies (under the scope of provincial and municipal governments, autonomous entities, provincial and municipal companies, and inter-provincial entities), which are the organic units who produce, compile, interpret and disseminate official statistics.

Each province has a provincial statistics office (PSO), under the provincial government. INDEC signs agreements with each PSO concerning the activities to be carried out during a year in terms of organisation and conducting national operations, following the federal nature of the Republic of Argentina.

In 1980, INDEC established a division by regions to provide statistical information. The regions were Metropolitan, Cuyo, North-West, North-East, Pampas and Patagonia. The Institute's current regional nomenclature is as follows.

- North-West: provinces of Catamarca, Jujuy, La Rioja, Salta, Santiago del Estero and Tucumán.
- North-East: provinces of Corrientes, Chaco, Formosa and Misiones.
- Cuyo: provinces of Mendoza, San Juan and San Luis.
- Pampas: provinces of Buenos Aires (for some publications, this region includes Greater Buenos Aires), Córdoba, Entre Ríos, La Pampa and Santa Fe.
- Patagonia: provinces of Río Negro, Neuquén, Chubut, Santa Cruz and the American continent sector of the province of Tierra del Fuego, Antarctica and Islas del Atlántico Sur (districts of Río Grande, Tolhuin and Ushuaia, and the Islas Malvinas of the Islas del Atlántico Sur district).
- Antarctica: Antarctic sector of the province of Tierra del Fuego, Antarctica and Islas del Atlántico Sur (Antártida Argentina and Georgias del Sur, Orcadas del Sur, Sandwich del Sur and Aurora islands of the Islas del Atlántico Sur district).
- Greater Buenos Aires: Autonomous City of Buenos Aires and, since 2016, 31 districts of the province of Buenos Aires (Almirante Brown, Avellaneda, Berazategui, Cañuelas, Escobar, Esteban Echeverría, Ezeiza, Florencio Varela, General Rodríguez, General San Martín, Hurlingham, Ituzaingó, José C. Paz, La Matanza, Lanús, Lomas de Zamora, Malvinas Argentinas, Marcos Paz, Merlo, Moreno, Morón, Pilar, Presidente Perón, Quilmes, San Fernando, San Isidro, San Miguel, San Vicente, Tigre, Tres de Febrero and Vicente López).

The new structure, approved by resolution 426-E/2017, included six new regional offices, one for each statistical region established by INDEC: Greater Buenos Aires, Cuyo, Pampas, North-East (NEA), North-West (NOA) and Patagonia.

In December 2017, the Institute announced the creation of regional offices NEA and NOA. The Patagonia office was inaugurated in March 2018. These offices represent the Institute and the National Directorate of the NSS as an institutional link with provincial and local statistical bodies. Among other responsibilities, they must also enable the processes and tasks in the annual statistical programme, national censuses and other statistical operations; propose actions to improve the articulation of the NSS; and provide technical assistance to provincial and local agencies to strengthen the public statistical service.

== Statistical secrecy ==
Decree 3110/70, article 14 describes the regulatory provisions of Law 17622, and establishes that all communication from the Institute must ensure statistical secrecy, i.e. the confidentiality of the individual data provided by respondents. All data shall be published solely as statistics, in a way that cannot infringe trade or proprietary confidentiality, or enable identification of the persons or bodies to which the data refers.

"Individual statements and/or information shall not be communicated to third parties –even if they are judicial authorities or official services other than the NSS's –, nor shall they be used, disseminated or published in such a way that enables the identification of the individual or entity making the statement or providing the information".

Additionally, article 15 states that "the peripheral statistical services may have access to the individual information gathered by the central statistical services on condition that they are based on legal instruments that establish the same obligation, prohibition and punishment regime to safeguard statistical secrecy."

Statistical secrecy, also called "statistical confidentiality", is a legal resource used by official statistical offices around the world to protect respondents' individual data.

- In the statistical field, the laws that safeguard confidentiality of sources is based on the need to preserve the privacy of persons and entities against events or actions that third parties could provoke, induce or carry out to the detriment of respondents.
- Individual data protections are contained in the legislation in force, which includes Law 17622, which created INDEC, its regulatory provision (Decree 3110/70) and further supplementary provisions, publicly available on INDEC's web page.
- Articles 10, 13 and 17 of the Law establish that every participant at any stage of production of official statistical information has the obligation of maintaining statistical secrecy.
- Items 5 and 10 of Provision 011/88, Annex I (confirmed and updated by Provision 176/99), detail that "no information which, as a result of the simultaneous application of various conditioning criteria, corresponds to a limited amount of elements may be provided, since in such a case the units may be easily identified" and "the data are to be published in such a manner that avoids deducing the numerical value corresponding to a certain statistical unit which is known to integrate the universe presented in the table", respectively.
- The databases provided must be unnamed and, in cases in which an economic sector or geographic zone shows less than three records, these units must be grouped in other categories to avoid possible identification or deduction of individual values. This confidentiality system matches the ones used internationally.
- The production of statistics is based on the capacity to request and obtain data from individual respondents and compile the data. Whatever the nature or condition of the respondent, collaboration lies largely on the trust conveyed by the requester.
- For this reason, in all countries, statistics are legally related to two types of duties:

a) the respondent's duty to provide truthful information b) the statistical office's duty to ensure that the individual response be handled with the strictest confidentiality.

This is the principle of "statistical secrecy", i.e. the legal protection of any natural or legal person obliged to provide data to the NSS services, to be used solely for statistical purposes.

== History ==
On 25 January 1968, Law 17622 established the creation of the National Institute of Statistics and Censuses (INDEC, for its Spanish acronym), under the National Presidency's National Development Council (CONADE, for its Spanish acronym). Two major innovations can be identified in the Law:

The creation of an Institute in charge of setting the national rules in statistical matters and of managing and coordinating the National Statistical System (NSS), as well as the traditional collecting and producing series, surveys and censuses.

The inclusion of the principle to produce and centralise the necessary regulatory bases to ensure comparability and quality of the information developed by the NSS and decentralising the executive stages.

The first offices were in the 8th, 9th and 12th floors of the Secretariat of State for Treasury, at 250 Hipólito Yrigoyen, Buenos Aires City.

The National Director of Statistics and Censuses at that time, Enrique Compiano, relinquished his post on 2 January, but remained the Institute's ad honorem director until the new head was appointed (CONADE Resolution 2/69). On 24 March, Decree 1263 appointed Juan Vital Sourrouille as director of INDEC.

Mr Sourrouille resigned on 3 November 1970 and Carlos Noriega was appointed as his replacement (Resolution 482 of 2 November).

On 12 March 1971, the Executive Power issued Decree 812 to appoint Jorge Sakamoto as the new Director of the Institute. Mr Sakamoto resigned on 29 September (Decree 4390). On the same date, Decree 439 ordered the intervention of INDEC by means of the appointment of Brigadier Carlos Federico Bosch as intervenor.

On 29 September 1973 the Secretariat of Government Planning and Action was dissolved (Decree 1450) and INDEC was transferred to the Secretariat of State for Economic Programming and Coordination, under the Ministry of Economy.

Intervenor Carlos Federico Bosch resigned from INDEC on 25 May (Decree 4528). Ozías Gianella took over as head of the Institute on 5 July ( Decree 414) but ceased his activities a few days later, on 20 July (Decree 99). Gianella's successor was Carlos Noriega, who took charge on 10 August ( Decree 347).

Carlos Noriega left his post on 1 June 1976 (Resolution 106), and Ricardo Brega was appointed acting director (Resolution 109 of 2 June).

In 1979, the former minister of Economy during the last military dictatorship, José Alfredo Martínez de Hoz, devised the "meatless" price index. During a period in which inflation was relentless, Martínez de Hoz decided to leave meat and its derivatives out of the calculation, to prove that cattle prices were causing inflation.

In 1980, Resolution 338 of 17 October entrusted the then national director of Financial and Production Statistics, Juan Cayetano Olivero, with "the duties and functions of the Director-General of the National Institute of Statistics and Censuses, provided in Decree 3110/70, with the status of Article 28."

In 1981, INDEC was transferred to the Undersecretariat of Economic Programming, under the Ministry of Economy. The following year, INDEC was transferred to the Secretariat of Treasury (Ministry of Economy). Decree 125 issued on 21 July in the Official Bulletin, officially appointed Juan Cayetano Olivero as the Institute's Director-General.

On 29 April 1983, INDEC's new public service and training facilities, under the Statistical Dissemination Department, were inaugurated. The offices were located at 1924 Alsina St., Buenos Aires City.

On 6 January 1984, INDEC was transferred to the National Presidency's Secretariat of Planning (Decree 135). Director-General Juan Cayetano Olivero resigned on 13 December 1983, and the Ministry of Economy accepted his resignation on 3 January 1984, by Resolution 1. On 11 January, Decree 163 appointed Luis Alberto Beccaria as Director-General.

By Resolution 226, the Secretariat of Planning accepted the resignation of Luis Alberto Beccaria on 11 June 1990. Two days later, on 13 June, the new director, Hector Valle took charge ( Decree 1114).

In 1991, INDEC was transferred to the Secretariat of Economic Programming (Ministry of Economy and Public Services). On 8 October, Héctor Valle resigned and, on 15 October, Héctor Montero was appointed acting Director-General ( Decree 2083).

In April 1992, INDEC's headquarters were moved to the Ministry of Economy building, which it now occupies in full, at 609 Presidente Julio Argentino Roca Ave., Autonomous City of Buenos Aires (joint Resolution 49 of 1 April). Originally, Resolution 1691 of the Ministry of Economy and Public Services had stated on 8 January that the Institute would move to the agencies available at the National Development Bank (BANADE, for its Spanish acronym). However, that Resolution was overruled by Resolution 228, issued on 2 March. Towards the end of 1992, the Technological Modernisation Plan was implemented, which entailed new IT equipment for INDEC, a network and communications system, and the standardisation of technological platforms. As a result of this plan, the dbINDEC databank was presented, designed as a great electronic library of statistical tables, which began the era of public and free access to official statistics.

Decree 1831 of 1993 established that INDEC would centralise coordination, monitoring and control actions to guarantee the efficient functioning of the National Statistical System, both at the national and at the provincial levels. Additionally, the Decree established that the ministries, secretariats and other State bodies should provide, in a timely fashion, the necessary elements to guarantee the statistical information that INDEC should require to meet its annual plans, and that the Institute would have the powers to include other State bodies in the National Statistical System. On 13 August, the Statistical Services Centre (CES, for its Spanish acronym) was created to improve communication between INDEC and data users, not only to offer products and services, but also to receive specific requirements. The Statistical Dissemination Department, located at 1924 Alsina St., was moved to the new headquarters at 609 Presidente Julio Argentino Roca Ave.

In 1996, Argentina adhered to the International Monetary Fund's (IMF) Special Data Dissemination Standard (SDDS), an initiative to produce more timely and complete data. The new standards required, among other matters, a release calendar with a minimum advance of four months, and substantial improvements in data periodicity and timeliness. The National Nomenclature System (SiNN, for its Spanish acronym) was created, motivated by the need to harmonise the different nomenclatures used for statistics and their important role in transforming data in information systems. It was managed by a team dedicated to the administration, assistance and dissemination of the range of classifications and codes available internationally, regionally and nationally.

In 1997, the Federal System of Statistical Publication Distribution (SIDIFE, for its Spanish acronym) was created as a communication channel developed by INDEC to meet the regular demand for statistical data in Argentina. In this way, INDEC's free publication distribution to libraries around the countries was expanded, and its dissemination network improved.

In 1999, when Roque Fernández was minister of Economy, there was controversy around the imports index. The Institute corrected the published values, allegedly due to a mix-up at Customs with the correct numbers. The correction showed 1 billion USD more and the deficit was reduced from 64 billion USD to 54 billion USD, a number that was closer to that year's IMF goal.

Director-General Héctor Montero resigned on 30 October 2000. On 1 November, Osvaldo Kacef was appointed Director-General of INDEC (Decree 1005).

On 3 April 2001, Osvaldo Kacef resigned as Director-Genera. Héctor Montero began a second term as Director-General on 10 April ( Decree 413). In October, the 2001 National Census of Population, Households and Dwellings took place. To identify and characterise the indigenous population in the national territory, the form included a question to detect households in which at least one person identified as descending from or belonging to indigenous peoples. This was the first stage of an integral methodological proposal, the second stage being the 2004/2005 Supplementary Survey of Indigenous Peoples (ECPI, for its Spanish acronym). The Census detected a total population of 36,260,130.

In 2002, Juan Carlos Del Bello became INDEC's new Director-General by Decree 254 of 6 February. He replaced Héctor Montero, who had resigned on 1 January.

The 2002 National Agricultural Census included the recommendations of the Food and Agriculture Organization (FAO) on inter-census and international comparability. The operation was once again based on printed forms applied to different regions, but included the existence of and access to technological conditions. This allowed —even with budget restrictions— entering questionnaires with optic reading, with an inconsistency resolution process that enabled final results in a shorter time period than the 1988 National Agricultural Census.

The Permanent Household Survey (PHS), which had been done since 1973 by point measurement of two annual waves (May and October), became a continuous survey with quarterly data publication in 2003. Following Juan Carlos Del Bello's resignation, Decree 81 of 29 May appointed Lelio Mármora as the new Director-General of INDEC.

In November 2005, INDEC launched the report National Consumer Price Index – First stage, base 2003=100, in which eight jurisdictions participated: Autonomous City of Buenos Aires, Province of Buenos Aires, Córdoba, Santa Fe, Mendoza, Tucumán, San Luis and Catamarca. The 2004–2005 National Household Expenditure Survey (ENGHo) took place in the whole country with urban and rural coverage, between October 2004 and December 2005, in 45,326 dwelling selected from the National Sampling Frame of Dwellings (MMNV, for its Spanish acronym).

Unlike previous surveys, the 2004–2005 National Economic Census was done in two stages, a convergence between a territory sweep and a series of special operations and sampling economic surveys.

The 2004/2005 Supplementary Survey of Indigenous Peoples (ECPI), which recognised 600,329 indigenous people, was based on descendants of or persons belonging to indigenous peoples detected in the 2001 Census. Additionally, the first National Survey of the Activities of Children and Adolescents (EANNA, for its Spanish acronym) was developed in collaboration with the Ministry of Labour, Employment and Social Security (MTEySS, for its Spanish acronym) within the framework of the Child Labour Survey and Observatory programme, agreed between the Argentine Government and the International Labour Organization's (ILO) International Programme on the Elimination of Child Labour (IPEC).

== Controversy ==
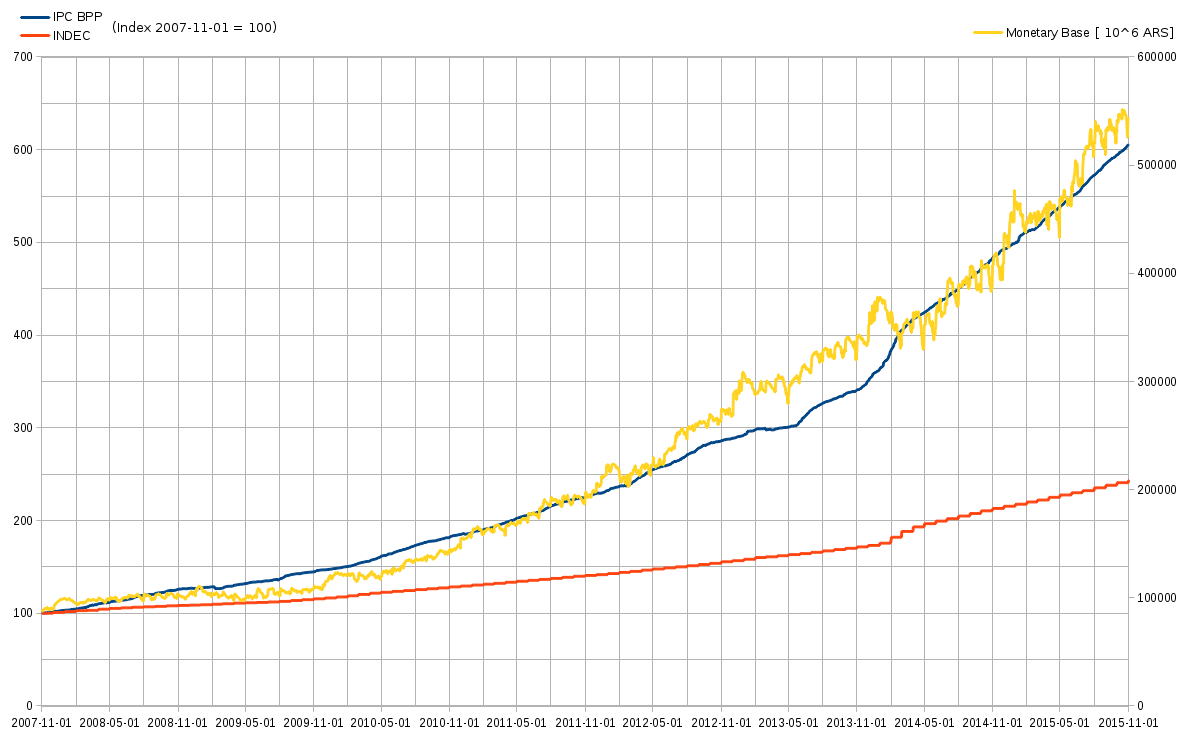
CPI from MIT Billion Prices project (blue), INDEC (orange) and monetary base (yellow) from November 2007 to December 2015. CPI index: 2007-11-01 = 100.

Although nominally independent, under the Nestor and Cristina Kirchner presidencies INDEC was subject to strong political pressure from the government, and its statistics were not considered trustworthy. Because INDEC's statistics were reported as being manipulated by the Kirchner government, it was considered "discredited".

Controversy arose when the government of President Néstor Kirchner replaced Graciela Bevacqua, the Consumer Prices Indicator director (Índice de Precios al Consumidor – IPC). Bevacqua is reported to have arrived at a consumer price increase figure of almost 2.0% for January 2007 from internal data but the rate officially reported to the public was 1.1%.

The head of INDEC resigned in March, and a new board of directors led by Ana María Edwin was installed by the Ministry of Economy; the board would operate under the supervision of Commerce Secretary Guillermo Moreno. A group of employees protested publicly at what they saw as a violation of INDEC's autonomy, and an attempt by the Economy Ministry under Felisa Miceli to illegally keep inflation indicators under one percent a month. Prosecutors gathered evidence that high government officials had inquired repeatedly of statistical staff how to get lower inflation numbers, and that in early 2007 managers of the price indexes had excluded products whose prices had risen more than 15% in the survey and changed price data after it came in from the field workers.

Prices and the official record continued to part ways since former Commerce Secretary Guillermo Moreno's decision to intervene in the statistics institute in 2007. Private-sector economists and statistical offices of provincial governments show inflation two to three times higher than INDEC's number (which only covers Greater Buenos Aires). Unions, including those from the public sector, use these independent estimates when negotiating pay rises. Surveys by Torcuato di Tella University show inflation expectations running at 25–30%.

INDEC's headline inflation statistics were substantially lower than estimates from analysts in the private sector and also lower than INDEC's implicit private consumption price index which is incorporated in the measurement of real GDP. Taken from the first quarter of 2007, each index (from the same quarter the year before) has read as follows:

Reported consumer price inflation in Argentina
Quarter	Consumer prices	Implicit private consumption prices
I 2007	9.5%	10.6%
II 2007	8.8%	11.7%
III 2007	8.6%	14.8%
IV 2007	8.5%	14.9%
I 2008	8.5%	15.7%
II 2008	9.1%	19.7%
III 2008	9.1%	18.2%
IV 2008	7.8%	15.7%
I 2009	6.6%	12.4%
II 2009	5.5%	11.8%
III 2009	5.9%	11.8%

The discrepancy led to exchanged accusations of politically motivated statistical legerdemain between the ruling party and most of the political opposition, on both left and right. Officials facing election have an incentive to understate the headline CPI figure. Opposition figures frequently relied on estimates made by figures such as Orlando Ferreres (a former Bunge y Born agribusiness executive and Economic Planning Secretary for a leading opponent, former President Carlos Menem).

The practice yielded the ruling party no political benefit, and helped contribute to their loss in the October 2009 mid-term elections. An alternative explanation for the policy could rest on government finances: the national government has issued around US$100 billion in government bonds. Payments on almost US$50 billion of this are indexed to inflation. Other government bonds are tied in value to GDP growth. A 7-point underestimate in inflation could save the Central Bank of Argentina US$3 billion in inflation-indexed interest payments, while higher economic growth would cost added interest on bonds tied to GDP; hence, there is a short-run financial benefit to the government from a discrepancy between the two inflation readings in the table.

Since 2007, when Guillermo Moreno, the secretary of internal trade, was sent into the statistics institute, INDEC, to tell its staff that their figures had better not show inflation shooting up, prices and the official record have parted ways. Private-sector economists and statistical offices of provincial governments show inflation two to three times higher than INDEC's number (which only covers greater Buenos Aires). Unions, including those from the public sector, use these independent estimates when negotiating pay rises. Surveys by Torcuato di Tella University show inflation expectations running at 25-30%

— The Economist

.
