= Qabbani =

Qabbani is a surname. Notable people with the surname include:

- Abu Khalil Qabbani (1835–1902), Syrian playwright and composer of Turkish origin
- Ghalia Qabbani, Syrian writer and journalist
- Ismail al-Qabbani (1898–1963), Egyptian reforming educationalist
- Mohammed Rashid Qabbani (born 1942), former Grand Mufti of Lebanon and the most prominent Sunni Muslim cleric in the country
- Mundhir Qabbānī (born 1970), also known as Monzer al-Qabbani, Saudi writer, novelist and surgeon
- Nizar Qabbani (1923–1998), Syrian diplomat, poet and publisher
- Sabah Qabbani (1928–2015), Ambassadors of Syria to the United States

== See also ==
- Wadi Qabbani, was a Palestinian Arab village in the Tulkarm Subdistrict
