= WikiTree =

Genealogy website

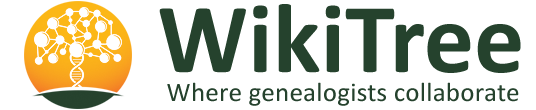

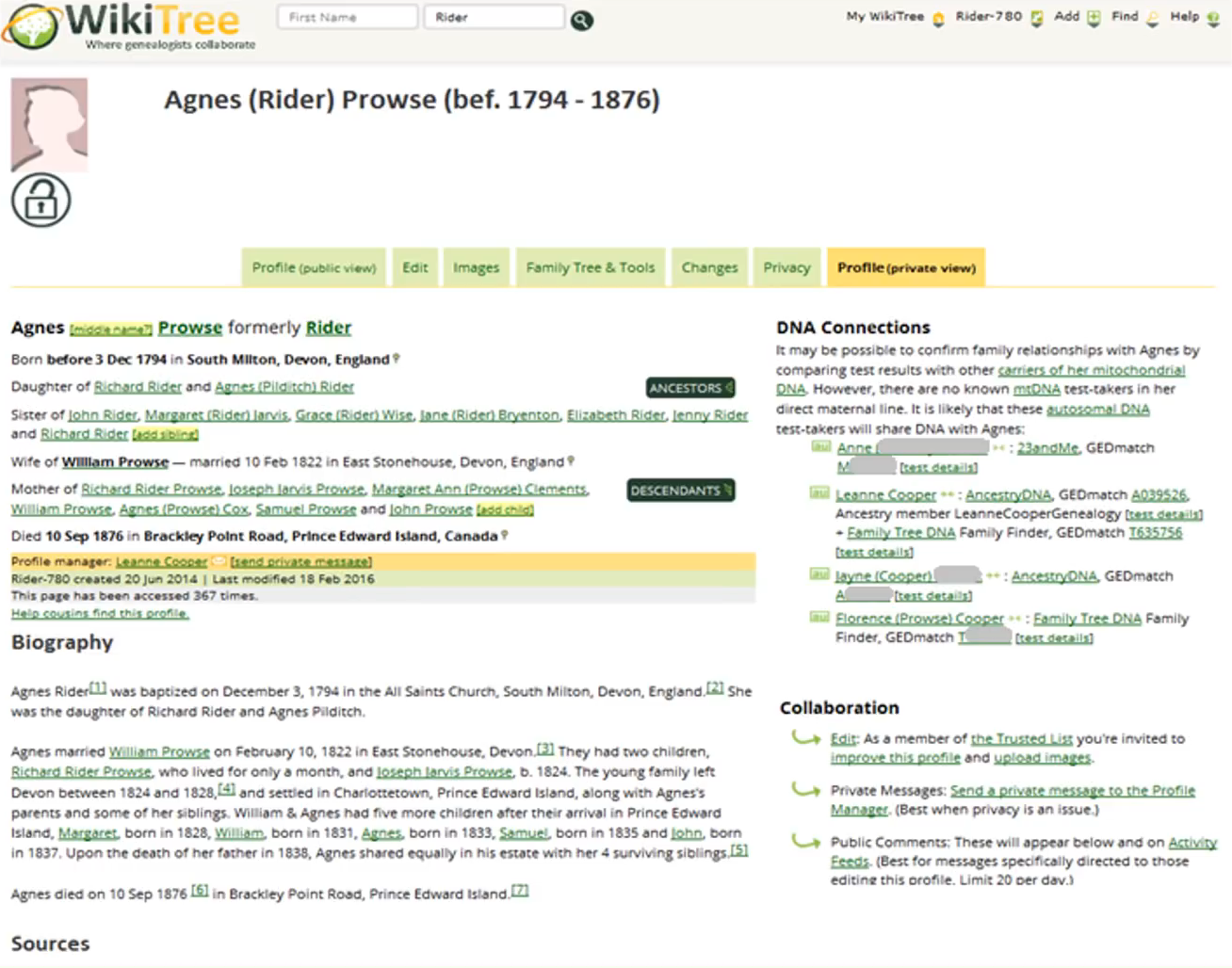
- Screenshot Screenshot of a WikiTree profile
- Company type: Privately-held company
- Founded: 2008
- Headquarters: New York, New York, U.S.
- Founder: Chris Whitten
- President: Chris Whitten
- Industry: Genealogy
- Website: wikitree.com

WikiTree is a genealogy website that allows users to contribute profiles and collaborate to build a single family tree, also known as a one world tree, by connecting profiles on the global WikiTree within the same system. WikiTree is free for the user and financed via advertisements.

As of October 2023, the WikiTree website claimed that the site had more than 1 million registered members and contained more than 36 million profiles of people, with over 12 million profiles of people who should share a detectable amount of DNA with tested site members, their deceased relatives, or those whose remains have been tested posthumously. As of July 2023, SimilarWeb ranked WikiTree as eighth in total World Wide Web traffic among "Ancestry and Genealogy" websites.

== History ==
Chris Whitten, the founder of WikiAnswers (originally FAQFarm), developed WikiTree in 2005, inviting users personally to the site, starting in early 2008. WikiTree.com opened to the public in November 2008. WikiTree is owned by Interesting.com, Whitten's company.

In 2015, the since-defunct Global Family Reunion Project was established, a tie-in to a worldwide family genealogy event hosted by author A.J. Jacobs, at which WikiTree "relationship finder" tools were available to calculate genealogical connections.

== Features ==
The site uses a wiki markup language (powered by a fork of the MediaWiki software) that enable users to create and edit personal profiles, categories and "free space" pages to document family history. The user interface is only available in English, while most of the help pages have been translated to Dutch, French and German.

The site's goal is to have one profile for every person, whether living or dead. Duplicate profiles are supposed to be merged and the information is consolidated, connecting different family branches in the process.

WikiTree's privacy controls allow users to protect the genealogy information of profiles they manage, and that of their more recent ancestors and descendants, while providing the ability to publicly share and collaborate on historical data related to their more distant forebears. Since April 2017, all profiles of people who were born more than 150 years ago or died more than 100 years ago are publicly visible.

=== DNA and confirmation ===
Registered users can provide information about their autosomal DNA tests and to link their WikiTree profile pages to autosomal DNA data packages they have uploaded at the GEDmatch website. GEDmatch publishes links to the WikiTree family trees of individuals who use this feature. Tools on the WikiTree website automatically display persons who took autosomal DNA tests and are within 3rd cousins of each other, allowing the display of several generations of ancestors and descendants who could have contributed to or inherited portions of a person's X chromosome(s), and allow Y-chromosome and mitochondrial DNA test results to be associated with the position of each father and mother in a person's family tree.

== Accolades and use ==
GenealogyInTime Magazine listed WikiTree as the 15th most popular genealogy site (out of 100) in January 2016 (the most recent time the magazine produced such a list). As of July 2023, SimilarWeb ranked WikiTree as eighth in total World Wide Web traffic among "Ancestry and Genealogy" websites, with visitor statistics including an average visit duration of more than 10 minutes and an average of 10.5 page views per visit.

Researchers in the fields of social and genealogical sciences have made use of WikiTree's data repository. Dr. Michael Fire, Faculty of the Department of Software and Information Systems Engineering at Ben-Gurion University of the Negev, utilized the genealogical data available on WikiTree to analyze historical lifespan patterns.

Further research by Fire, in a joint project with computer scientists Thomas Chesney and Yuval Elovici, ventured into computational genealogy. Using WikiTree's family tree data for quantitative analysis, this study aimed to develop and scrutinize hypotheses related to various aspects of human ancestry.
