= Hofele-Design =

German tuning company for Mercedes-Benz

Coordinates: 48°40′59″N 9°47′34″E

HOFELE-Design GmbH

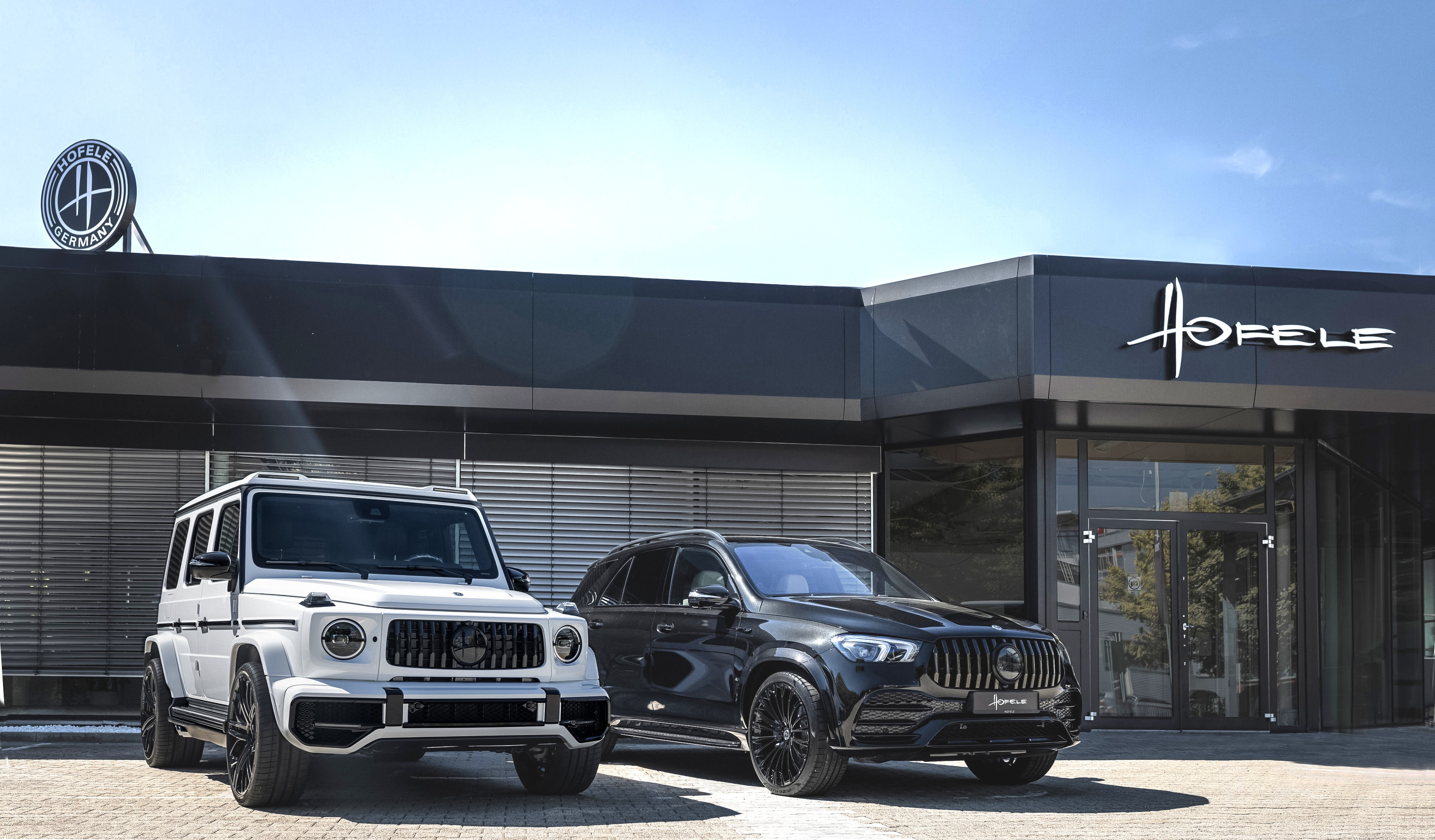
- Company type: Private
- Industry: Automotive
- Founded: 1983
- Headquarters: Sindelfingen, Germany
- Area served: Worldwide
- Products: Automobile; Automotive performance products
- Website: www.hofele.com

HOFELE-Design GmbH is a specialist German tuning company for Mercedes-Benz. HOFELE-Design is recognised by SAE International as a vehicle manufacturer and has been awarded a Worldwide Manufacturers Identification (WMI) code by the Kraftfahrt-Bundesamt (KBA).

== History ==
Founded in 1983 and is now located in Sindelfingen, Germany. HOFELE-Design GmbH was appointed by Mercedes-Benz AG as a contractual partner for the ‘tuning’ of Mercedes-Benz passenger cars in 2018.

== Operations ==
HOFELE-Design through is tuning contract with Mercedes-Benz AG supply and modify the complete range of Mercedes-Benz passenger cars.

== HOFELE-Design models ==
- Mercedes-Benz Maybach : HOFELE based on Mercedes-Benz Maybach, X222 Facelift
- Mercedes-Benz S-Class: HOFELE based on Mercedes-Benz S-Class, W/V 222 Facelift
- Mercedes-Benz GLS: HOFELE based on Mercedes-Benz GLS, X 166 Facelift
- Mercedes-Benz G-Class: HOFELE based on Mercedes-Benz G-Class, W 463 new model 2018
- Mercedes-Benz GLE: HOFELE based on Mercedes-Benz GLE-Coupé-Class, C 292
- Mercedes-Benz GLC: HOFELE based on Mercedes-Benz GLC-Coupé-Class, C 253
- Mercedes-Benz GLA-Class: HOFELE based on Mercedes-Benz GLA-Class SUV, X 156
- Mercedes-Benz CLS-Class: HOFELE based on Mercedes-Benz CLS-Class C 257
- Mercedes-Benz E-Class: HOFELE based on Mercedes-Benz E-Class, 2016-, W 2013
- Mercedes-Benz C-Class: HOFELE based on Mercedes-Benz C-Class 2018-, W 205
- Mercedes-Benz CLA: HOFELE based on Mercedes-Benz CLA-Class C 117
- Mercedes-Benz A-Class: HOFELE based on Mercedes-Benz A-Class 2018-, W 177
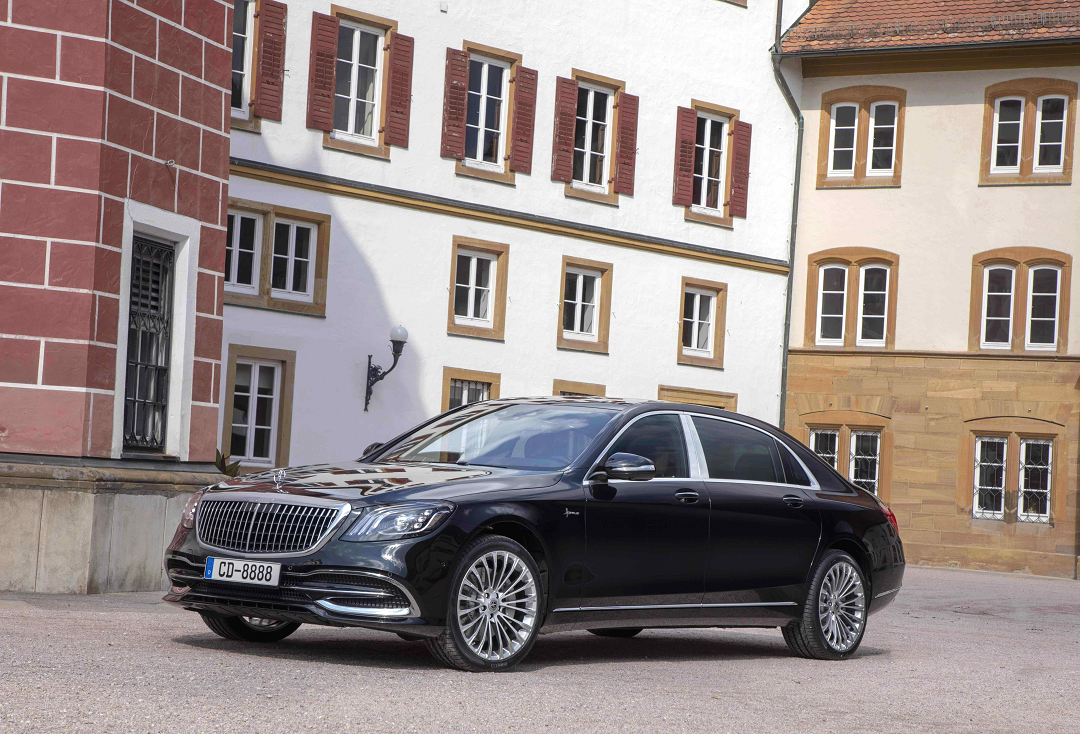
The new HOFELE based on Maybach.

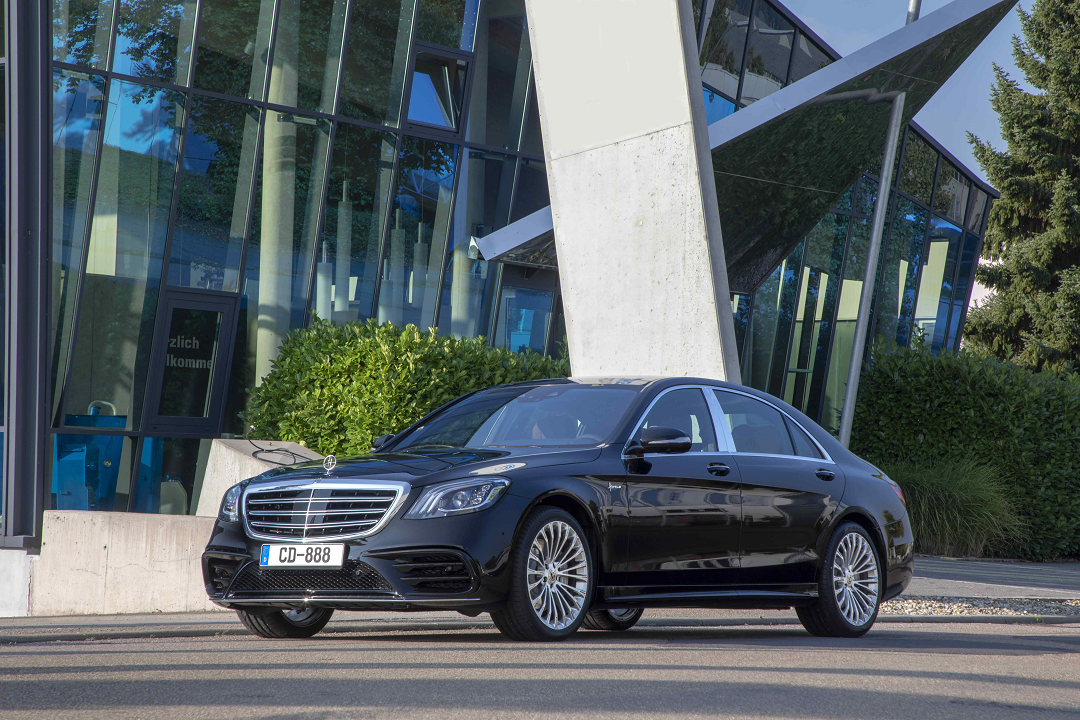
The new HOFELE based on S-Class.

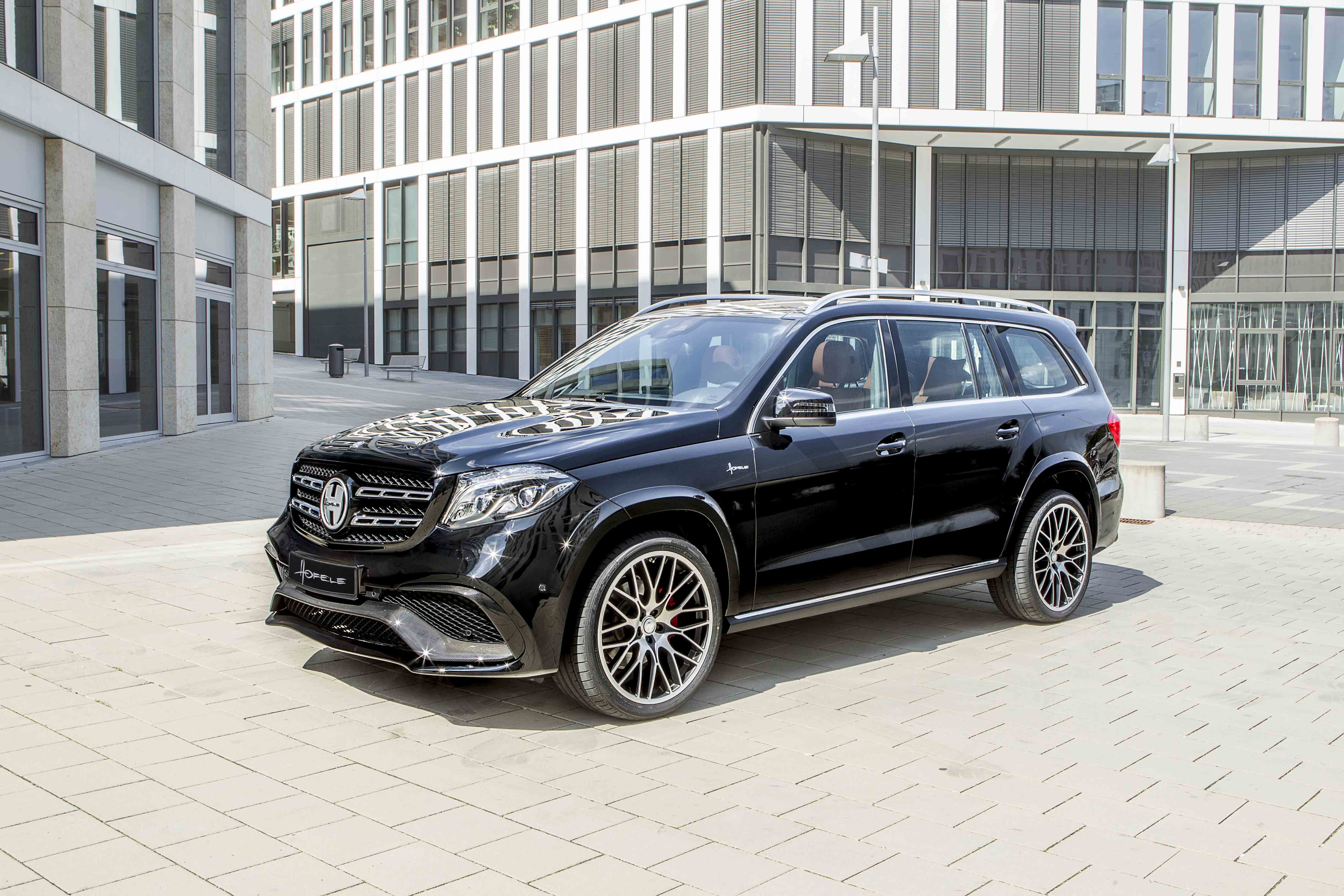
The new HOFELE based on GLS.

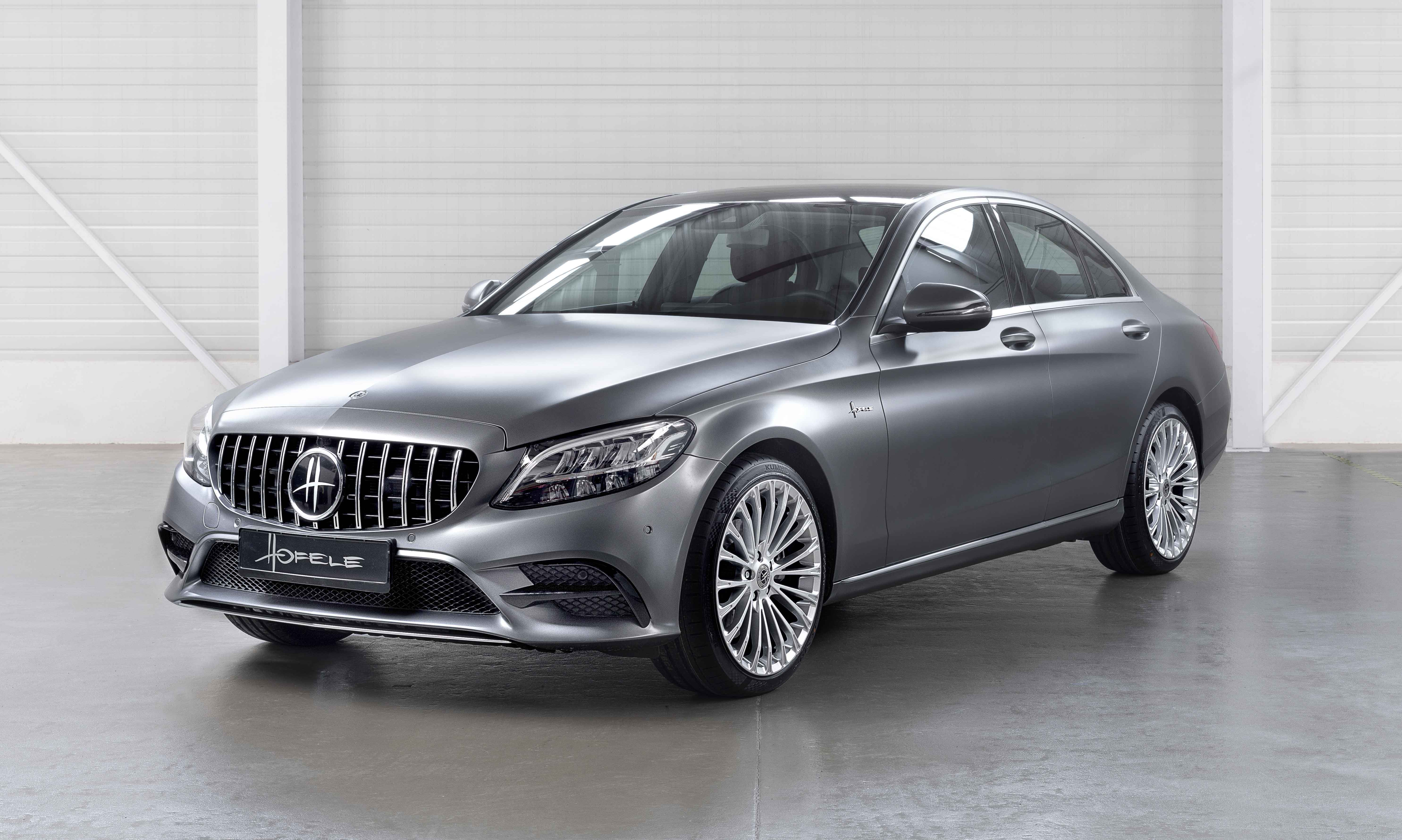
The new HOFELE based on the C-Class.

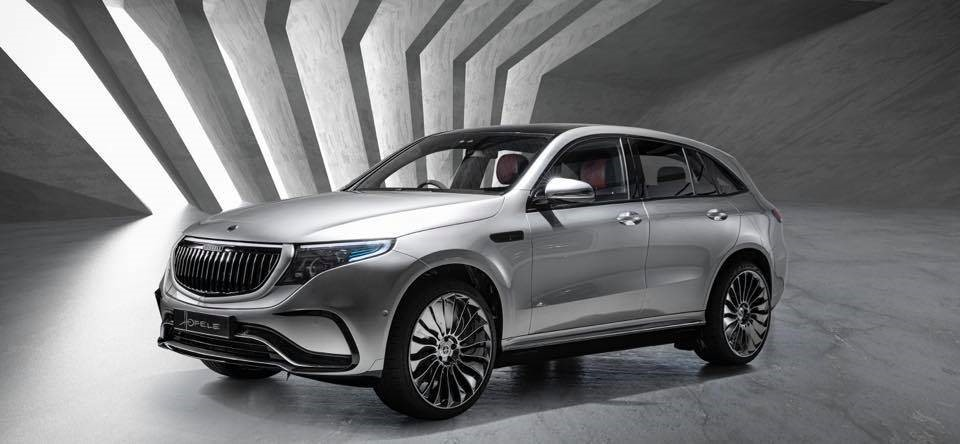
HOFELE HEQC

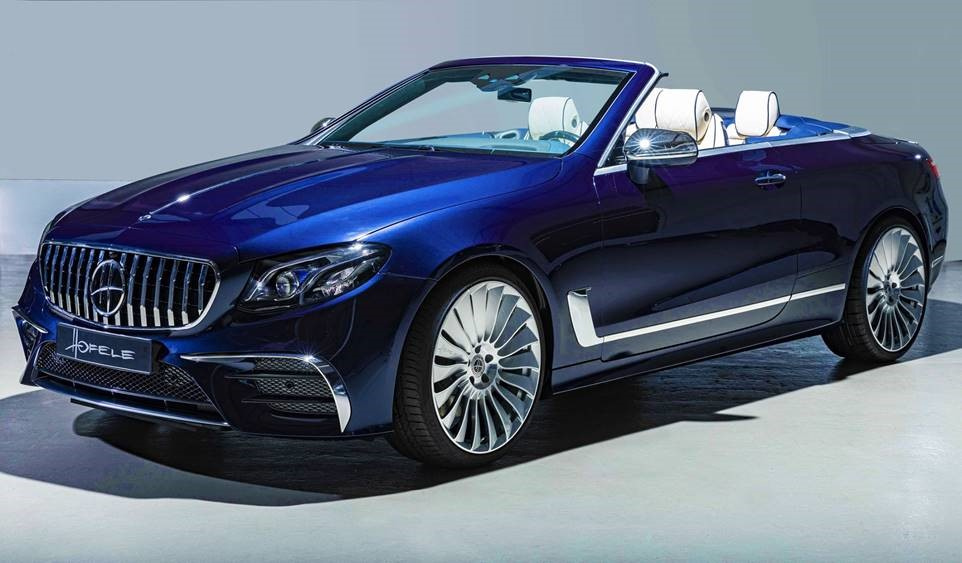
HOFELE HE Cabriolet

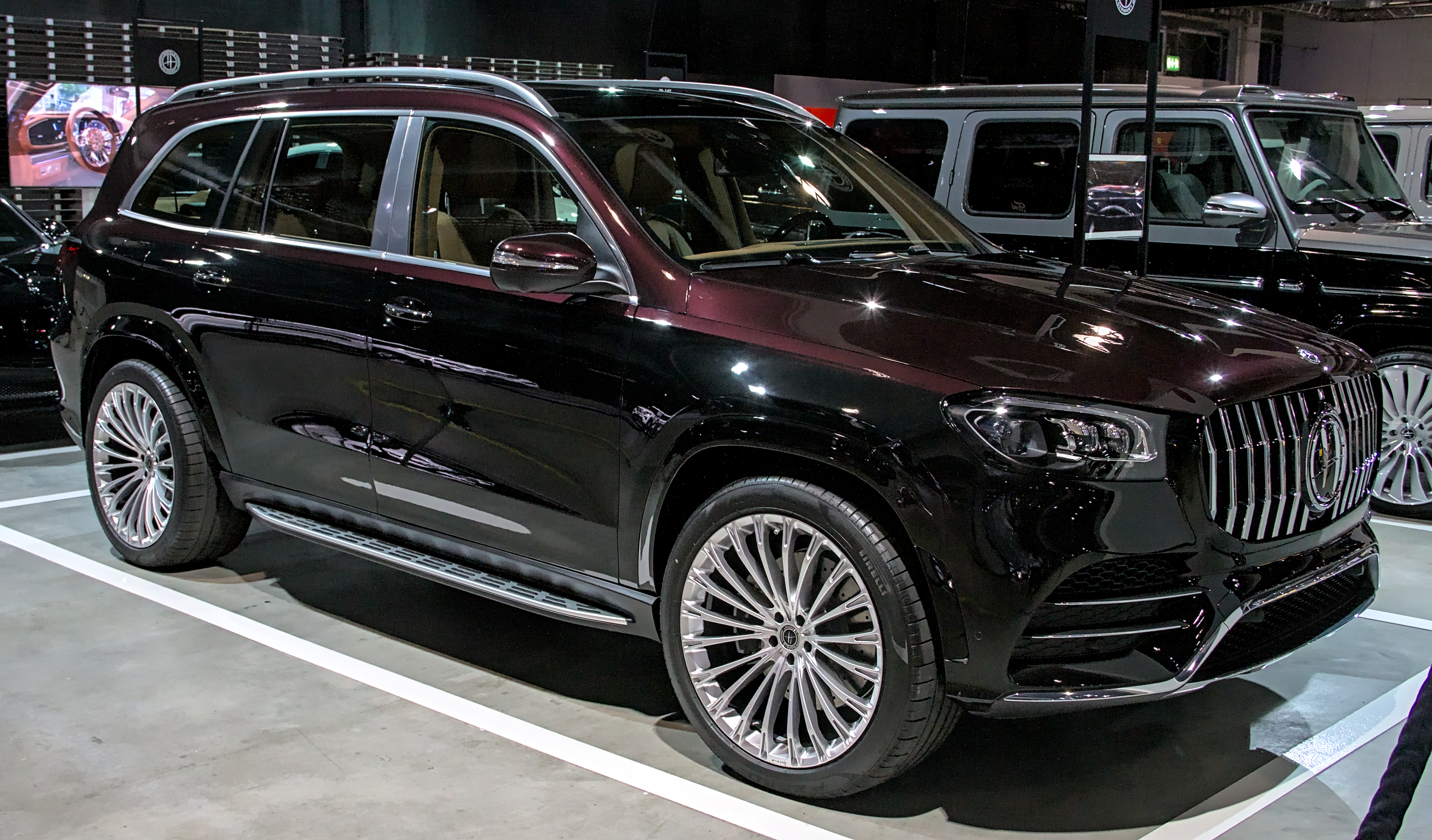
HOFELE HGLS 580 at 2021 Auto Zurich Car Show

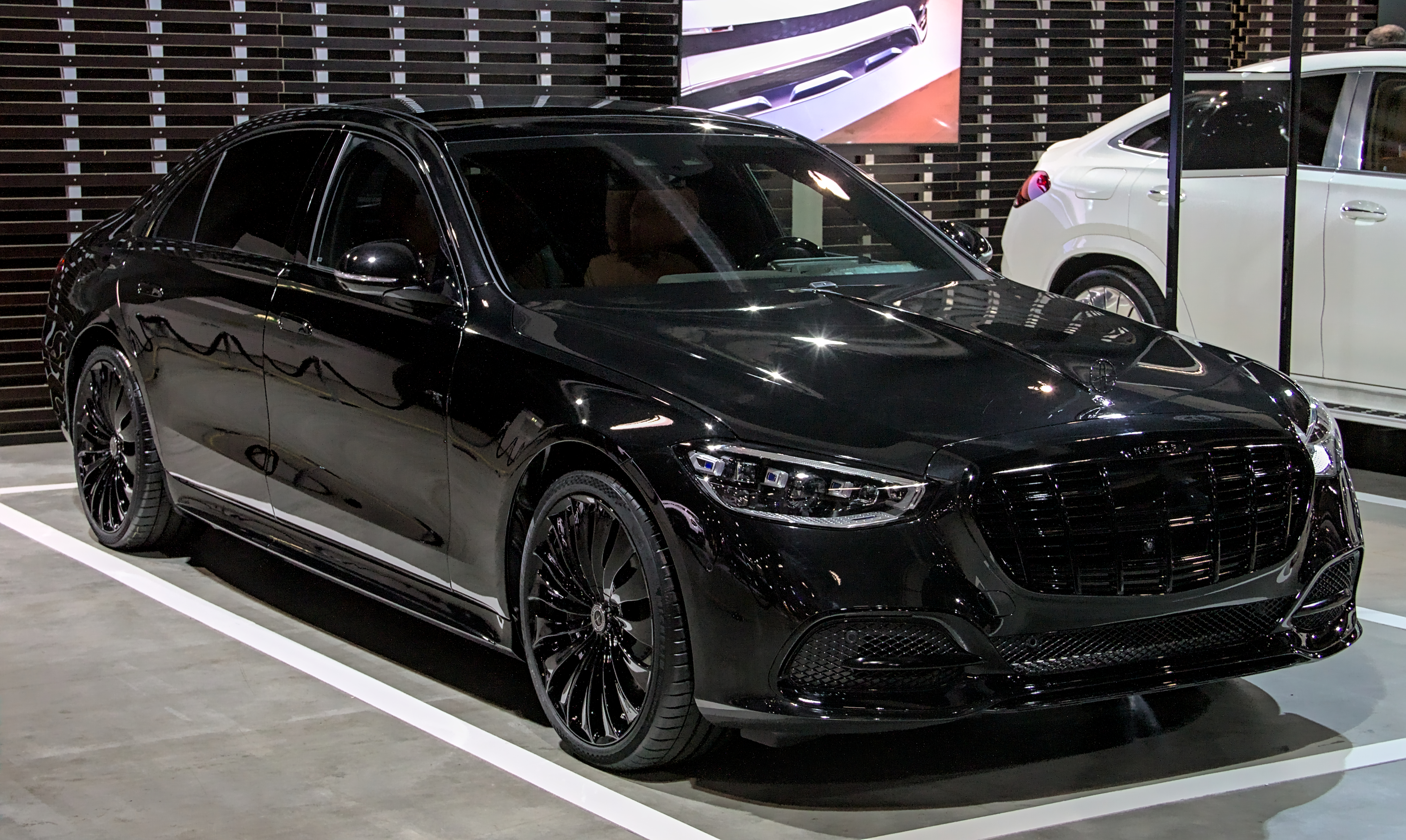
HOFELE HS 'Black Edition' at 2021 Auto Zurich Car Show

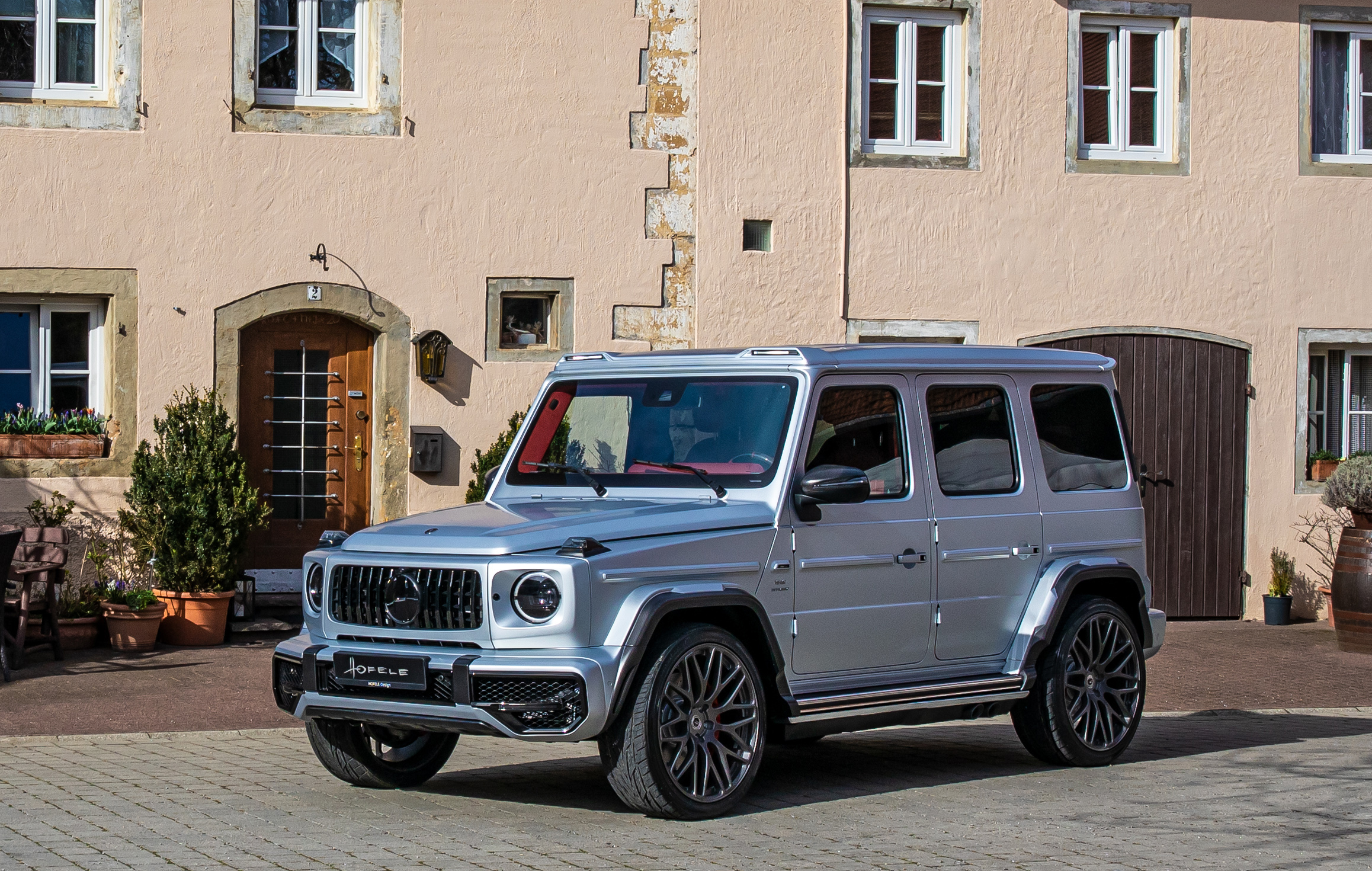
HG Moonbeam by HOFELE based on Mercedes-Benz G63

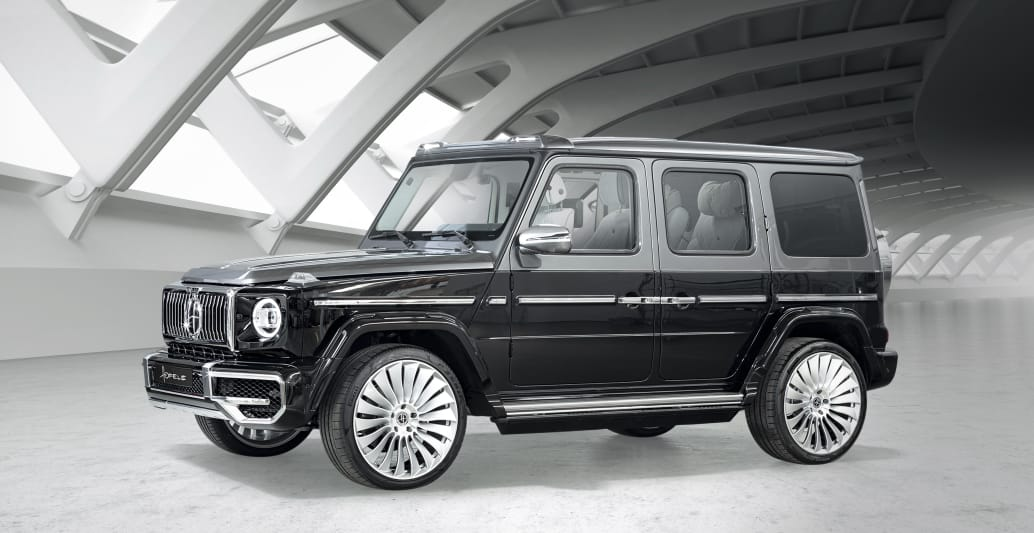
Ultimate HG by HOFELE based on Mercedes-Benz G Class

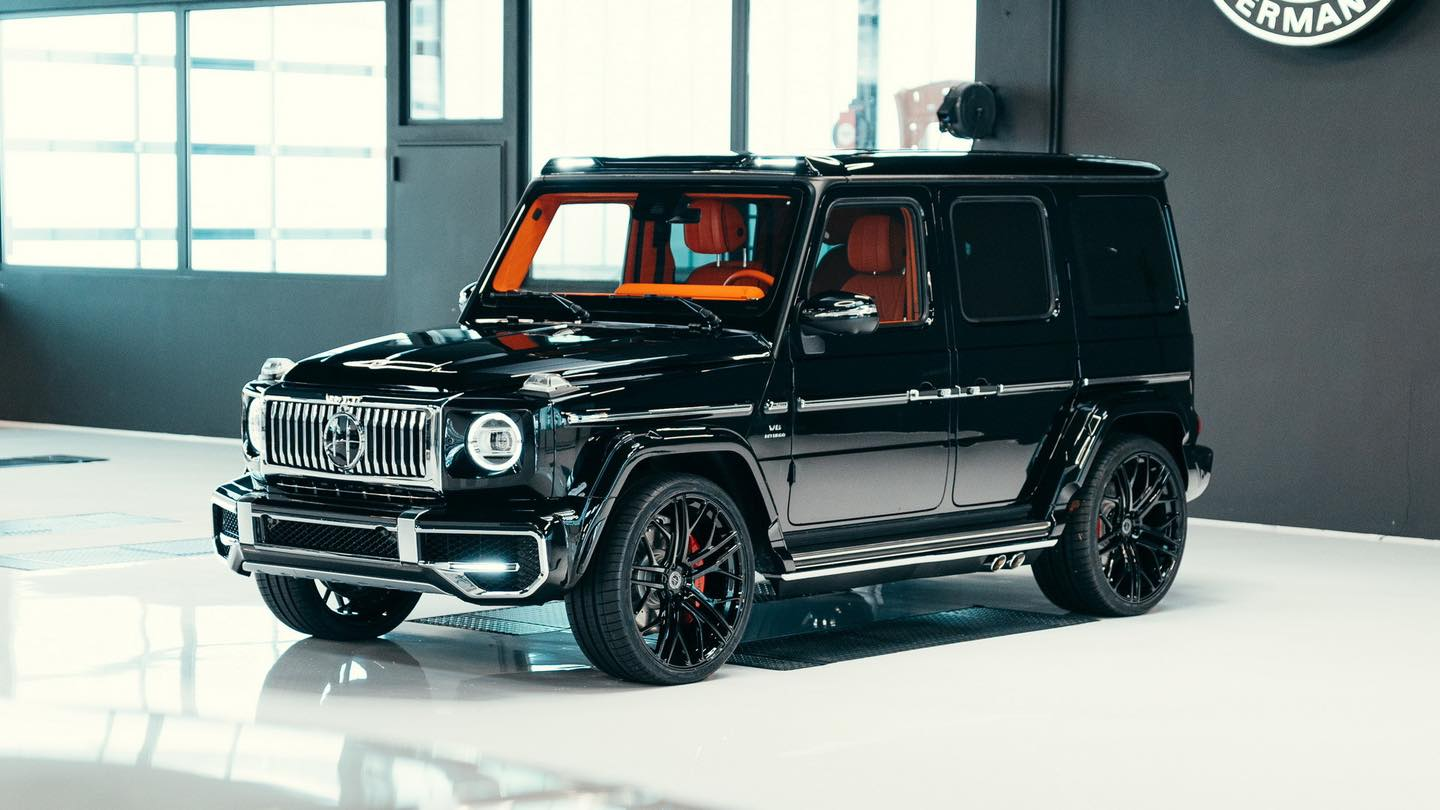
The 'HG Ultimate' by HOFELE based on Mercedes AMG G 63

== Records ==
HOFELE-Design is recognised by SAE International as a vehicle manufacturer and has been awarded a Worldwide Manufacturers Identification (WMI) Code by the Kraftfahrt-Bundesamt (KBA).

In 2010, European Motor Magazine Publisher has given HOFELE-Design a “Sport Auto” Award with the “SR8” – Concept, based on Audi A8. In the same year, Chamber of Commerce awarded HOFELE-Design to mark its 25 years of Export excellence to the World.

== See also ==
- Mercedes-Benz
- Daimler AG
- Maybach
- Carlsson
- Brabus
- Renntech
- Lorinser
- Styling Garage
- Kleemann
- Alpina
- ABT
- Horch
- Mansory
- Scaldarsi Emperor
