= Deep state (disambiguation) =

A deep state is a political situation in a country when an internal organ does not respond to the political leadership.

Deep state may also refer to:

- Deep State, a British espionage thriller TV series
- DeepStateMap.Live, a digital mapping service documenting the Russian invasion of Ukraine
- The Deep State: The Fall of the Constitution and the Rise of a Shadow Government, a book by Mike Lofgren on American politics

== See also ==
- Shadow government (disambiguation)
- Deep state in Turkey, the alleged Turkish system
- Deep state in the United States, the alleged American system
