= Allen County Public Library =

Public library system in Fort Wayne, Indiana, U.S.

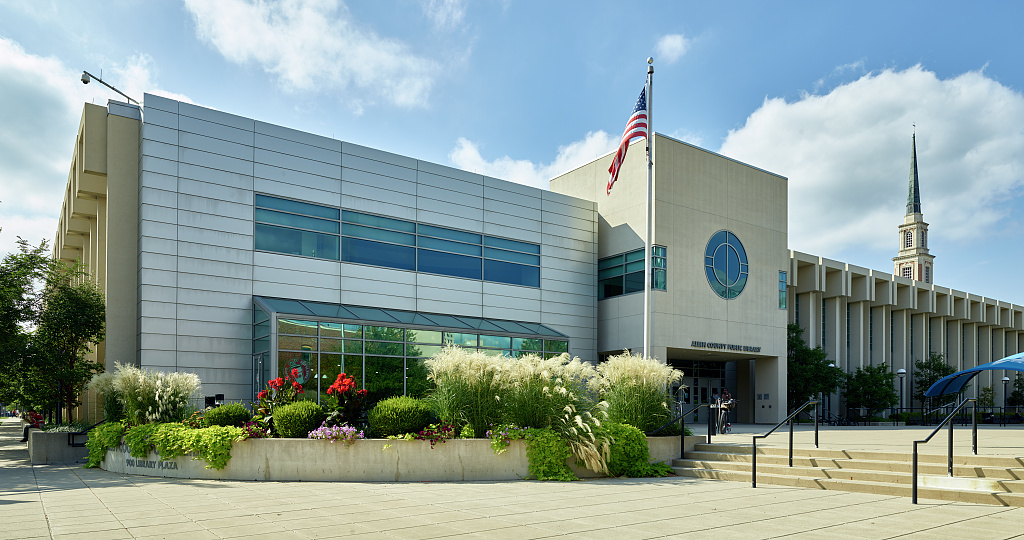
- Main Library in 2016
- 41°4′37.6″N 85°8′35.5″W
- Location: Fort Wayne, Indiana, U.S.
- Type: Public library
- Established: 1895; 131 years ago
- Branches: 13

Collection
- Size: 2.5 million (print books)

Access and use
- Circulation: 3.15 million (Note: The library's annual circulation declined from 10.3 million items in 2019, a typical year, to 3.15 million in 2020 due to the COVID-19 pandemic in Indiana.)
- Population served: 385,410
- Members: 188,086

Other information
- Budget: $31,165,237
- Director: Susan Baier
- Employees: 305
- Website: acpl.lib.in.us
- References: Allen County Public Library Facilities Master Plan, 2022

The Allen County Public Library (ACPL) is a public library system located in Fort Wayne, Indiana, United States. Founded in 1895 as the Fort Wayne Public Library, the library served residents with 3,606 books out of a single room in City Hall. Today the library system includes a main library and 13 branch libraries in Fort Wayne and throughout the county. The 367,000 square feet (34,100 m^{2}) Main Library Branch in downtown Fort Wayne is home to the Fred J. Reynolds Historical Genealogy Department which holds the largest public genealogy collection in the United States.

== Timeline ==
1895 – Library opened in City Hall on January 28 with 3,606 volumes.
1898 – Library Board purchased the Brackenridge Home at Wayne Street and Webster Street for $14,000.
1904 – Carnegie-funded library building opened.
1923 – Service to county residents began. Fort Wayne Public Library became Public Library of Fort Wayne and Allen County.
1944 – Main Library expansion began with purchase of Hollywood Building on Washington Boulevard to house administrative offices.
1952 – Young Adult Department opened in basement of main library, the first such department in the country.
1968 – 173,500-square-foot (16,120 m^{2}) building at Wayne and Webster Streets was dedicated August 21, 1968.
1977 – Construction of the new addition to the Main Library began.
1980 – Public Library of Fort Wayne and Allen County officially became Allen County Public Library by an act of the state legislature on January 1.
1985 – Estimated 5,500 people ate 2,731 pizzas during the system's 90th birthday celebration.
1997 – Library Board and staff began system-wide space needs analysis for all library facilities.
2001 – Allen County taxpayers approved bond financing of the $84 million library expansion project.
2007 – Renovation and expansion of Main Library nears completion. Grand opening was held on January 27, 2007, with Randall T. Shepard, Chief Justice of the Indiana Supreme Court, among the speakers.
2022 - The library eliminates fines for children 17 and younger.

== Genealogy ==
The Fred J. Reynolds Historical Genealogy Department, located in the Main Library, is the largest public genealogy department in North America, home to more than 350,000 printed volumes and 513,000 items of microfilm and microfiche. Only the Family History Library in Salt Lake City, a private institution, is larger. Many books in the genealogy collection are also available for borrowing through the Internet Archive. Allen County Public Library is also a partner of WeRelate, a collaborative online genealogy database currently providing access to over one million records and two million person pages. The website also provides the largest documented place wiki available.

== Branches ==
The Main Library and nine of the Allen County Public Library's 13 branches are located in Fort Wayne. Four branches are located in municipalities within Allen County (the name of the communities these four branches are located in is indicated next to each library's name).

- Aboite Branch
- Dupont Branch
- Georgetown Branch
- Grabill Branch (Grabill)
- Hessen Cassel Branch
- Little Turtle Branch
- Monroeville Branch (Monroeville)
- New Haven Branch (New Haven)
- Pontiac Branch
- Shawnee Branch
- Tecumseh Branch
- Waynedale Branch
- Woodburn Branch (Woodburn)

== Facilities ==
The Main Library has five public meeting rooms that accommodate from six to 500 people. These rooms are available for use by the community for meetings and events. In addition, the building has six small group study rooms, a computer training room, and a theater that seats 230. Library branches also have meeting rooms and study rooms. The Main Library and the Georgetown branch have Maker Labs.

=== Access Fort Wayne ===
Access Fort Wayne (AFW) is a Public-access television cable TV station which provides a variety of unique services for the library. AFW originates three Public-access television channels from the Main Library. Access 1 is channel 25 on Verizon and 55 on Comcast. Access 2 is channel 27 on Verizon and 57 on Comcast. Government-access television (GATV), City TV is channel 28 on Verizon and 58 on Comcast. The channels can only be viewed on Comcast and Verizon inside of Allen County. AFW is a full production facility with two TV studios and editing facilities.

=== Audio Reading Service ===
Founded in 1979 as the Northeast Indiana Radio Reading Service (NEIRRS), the Audio Reading Service is a radio reading service for people with visual, physical, learning, language, or other disabilities and conditions that prevent them from reading printed materials. Under the leadership of library staff, volunteers read news and information from over 100 local and national newspapers, magazines, and other sources.

Previously transmitted on an SCA broadcast, the Audio Reading Service can be heard on the HD Radio station 89.1 FM HD2, broadcast from Fort Wayne. HD Radios are loaned out at no cost by the library. In addition, the service is available via PBS Fort Wayne TV channel 39.6, podcast, on-demand listening and downloads, live web streaming, the Sero mobile app, and TuneIn, and system-wide at select area healthcare facilities.

The Audio Reading Service broadcasts 24 hours a day, seven days a week, and reaches an estimated 80,000 individuals. It became a part of the Allen County Public Library in 2004 and changed its name to Audio Reading Service in 2015. It is a member of the International Association of Audio Information Services (IAAIS).

=== WELT 95.7 FM ===
WELT-LP is a non-commercial radio station, produced and delivered by members of the Fort Wayne community. From the studios at the downtown branch of the Allen County Public Library, WELT-LP's volunteers and staff promote programs with news about politics and community issues, plus music and entertainment performed by local, regional, and national artists in Fort Wayne venues. The station is an affiliate of the syndicated Pink Floyd program "Floydian Slip."

== See also ==
- List of largest libraries in the United States
