= Cyndi's List =

- Available in: English
- Founded: September 1995
- Headquarters: Milton, WA
- Industry: Genealogy
- Website: www.cyndislist.com

Cyndi's List of Genealogy Sites on the Internet is a categorized and cross-referenced list of links for genealogical research. The site contains roughly 332,000 links in more than 200 categories. Cyndi's List supplements operating expenses with affiliate advertising.

== History ==
The list was first created as a short list of genealogy bookmarks that was shared with the members of the Tacoma-Pierce County Genealogical Society at the September 1995 meeting. The website opened in March 1996; by the end of that year, it had more than 10,000 links. In 1998 it obtained its own domain name. The site has since received numerous awards.

The creator of the site, Cyndi Ingle, formerly Cyndi Howell, is the author of three books on genealogical research and the Internet, including a printed copy of Cyndi's List.

In 2012 the links directory of Cyndi's List was duplicated by a rival website.

== Structure ==
The links are categorised into sections which are then subdivided. The top level divisions in November 2007 were:

- Computers & the Internet
- Ethnic Groups & People
- Help from Others
- History
- Immigration, Emigration, Migration
- Localities
- Marketplace
- Memorabilia
- Military
- Miscellaneous
- Occupations
- Records
- Religions
- Research Tools & Reference Materials
- Wars

There were several other indexes, and a search facility using Google.

As of October 2019 there were around 250 categories, ranging from "United States" (165,618 entries, with by-state and other subdivisions), "United Kingdom & Ireland" (31,478 entries, subdivided) and "Personal Research" (11,503 entries) to "Schwenkfelder" and "Privacy and Open Access" (both 13 entries) and "Genealogical and Historical Data Standards" and "Heirlooms & Keepsakes" (both 4 entries).

== Bibliography ==
Books by Cyndi Howells:

- Netting Your Ancestors : Genealogical Research on the Internet. Genealogical Publishing Company. 1999. ISBN 978-0-8063-1546-1.
- Cyndi's List: a Comprehensive List of 40,000 Genealogy Sites on the Internet. Genealogical Publishing Company. 2000. ISBN 978-0-8063-1556-0.
- Planting Your Family Tree Online: How to Create Your Own Family History Web Site. National Genealogical Society Guides. Thomas Nelson, Inc. 2004. ISBN 978-1-4016-0022-8.
  - "Planting Your Family Tree Online: How To Create Your Own Family History Web Site". Review. National Genealogical Society. Archived from the original on October 11, 2007.
