= The Shadow of Government =

The Government of Shadow (Hukumat al-zill : riwayah) (Arabic: رواية حكومة الظل) is an Arabic novel written by Saudi novel writer Mundhir al-Qabbani (Arabic: منذر القباني) (also known as Munther Kabbani) and published in 2007. The book was praised by many critics for its groundbreaking style in Arabic literature which was dubbed as the first Arabic intellectual thriller.

The author, Mundhir al-Qabbani has been nicknamed by readers as "the Dan Brown" of the Arab world.
