= Reclaim The Records =

- Founded: Project started January 2015, formal incorporation December 2016, IRS non-profit status granted February 2017
- Founder: Brooke Schreier Ganz
- Type: 501(c)(3) non-profit
- Tax ID no.: EIN 81-4985446
- Purpose: Freedom of Information, open records, open data, archives, genealogy
- Location: Mill Valley, California
- Website: www.reclaimtherecords.org

Reclaim The Records is a non-profit organization and activist group that advocates for greater transparency and accessibility for genealogical, archival, and vital records in the United States. They use state Freedom of Information requests and lawsuits to force government agencies, archives, and libraries to provide copies of previously inaccessible records to the public. Reclaim The Records then digitizes and publishes the records online for free public use, without any copyrights or usage restrictions.

Reclaim The Records is the first genealogical organization to successfully sue a government agency for the release of records back to the public. As of July 2019, the organization has acquired and freely published more than twenty five million records, most of which had never been open to the public before in any location or format, or else were only available in very outdated formats such as microfiche in limited locations but had never gone online before.

== History ==
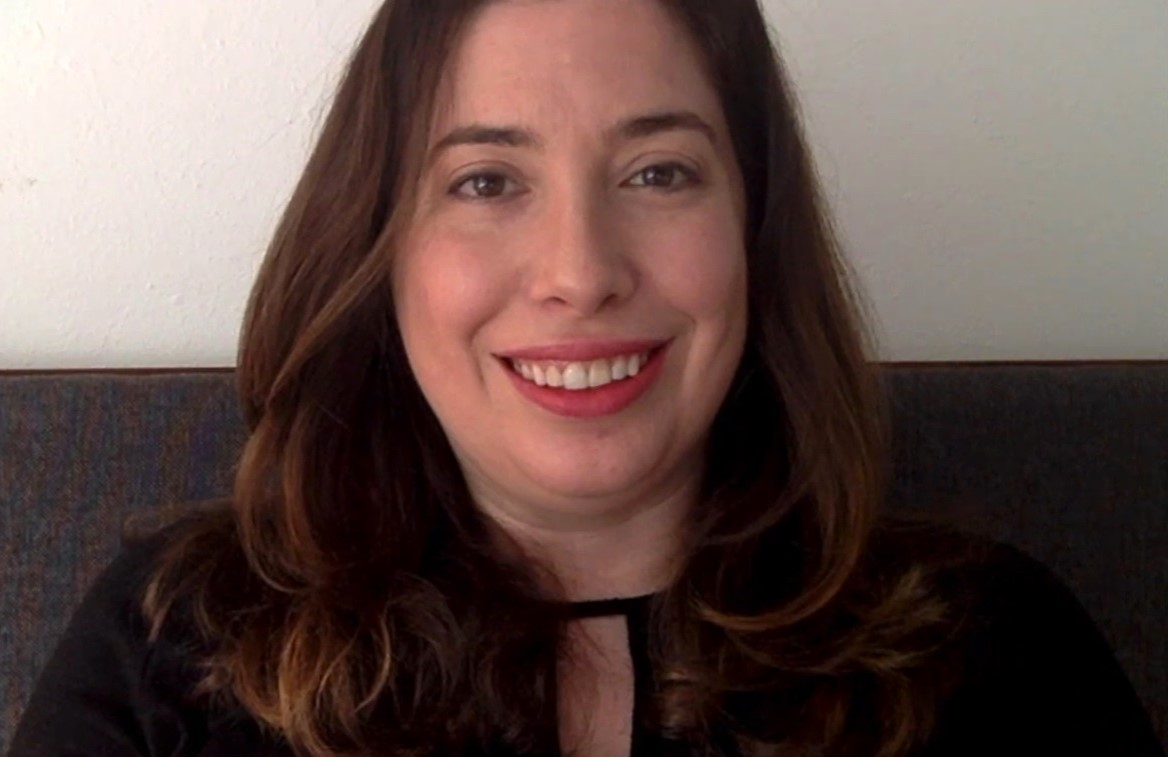
Brooke Schreier Ganz in 2019

Reclaim The Records was founded by Brooke Schreier Ganz, a technologist and long-time amateur genealogist. While living in California, Ganz had become increasingly frustrated by the lack of online access to New York City and New York State archival records. Almost none of the New York records had been put online by their respective city or state government archives or agencies, nor were the records available to search or to view through any genealogy websites, whether for-profit or non-profit. A small subset of the basic vital records index data was available to the public, but only if one was physically onsite in New York records repositories, and only in outdated formats such as microfilm and microfiche.

After unsuccessfully attempting to use New York City's open data law, Local Law 11 of 2012, to compel the publication of the basic indices to these records, Ganz decided to use the state's Freedom of Information Law (FOIL) to force the release of copies. She made a FOIL request of the New York City Municipal Archives in January 2015, which was initially agreed to and then denied by the city. This led to an Article 78 lawsuit in the Supreme Court of New York that August. Not wanting to sue the city with just her name on the case, Ganz created Reclaim The Records as an organization so that they could both be listed as Petitioner on the case. The city settled the case five days before they were due in court, and Ganz won the first public copies of the index to New York City marriage licenses for 1908–1929 on 48 rolls of microfilm. This was the first time that an American genealogist had ever successfully sued for the return of genealogical records to the public. The case proved that the Municipal Archives' holding were indeed subject to New York's FOIL.

In January 2016, Reclaim The Records filed another FOIL request that became another Article 78 lawsuit, this time filed against the New York City Clerk's Office. They too settled with the group, providing 110 reels of microfilm and copies of a digital database they had created for in-house use. The city also paid the organization's attorneys fees.

In November 2016, Reclaim The Records filed a third lawsuit under the Missouri Sunshine Law against the Missouri Department of Health and Senior Services for access to the basic index to births and deaths in the state. During the course of the lawsuit, it was discovered that the Missouri DHSS had been selling this same data to researchers for years, but was unwilling to provide copies to the public. The case is still pending.

Reclaim The Records was formally incorporated in December 2016 and was granted 501(c)(3) non-profit status by the IRS in February 2017.

== Notable legal cases ==
Name of record set	City and State	Government Agency	Legal action
New Jersey Marriage Index, 1901-2016	New Jersey	The New Jersey Department of Health	Ferretti v. New Jersey Department of Health - Office of Population Health, No. 2017/123 (settled, records turned over)
New York State Death Index, 1880-1956	All of New York State outside of New York City, excluding the cities of Albany, Buffalo, and Yonkers prior to 1915	The New York State Department of Health	Seventeen months of legal wrangling with the NYS DOH, including two FOIL requests and one FOIL appeal, but no litigation needed
New York City Marriage License Index, 1930-1995	New York City, New York	The New York City Clerk's Office	Reclaim the Records, et al, v. The City of New York, No. 100397/2016 [Sup Ct, NY Cnty] (settled, records turned over, attorneys fees paid)
New York City Marriage License Index, 1908-1929	New York City, New York	The New York City Municipal Archives, via their parent agency New York City Department of Records and Information Services (DORIS)	Brooke Schreier Ganz, et al, v. The City of New York, No. 101643/2015 [Sup Ct, NY Cnty] (settled, records turned over)
Index to New York City Marriage Licenses, 1996-2017	New York City, New York	The New York City Municipal Archives, via their parent agency New York City Department of Records and Information Services (DORIS)	Reclaim the Records, et al, v. The City of New York, No. 150250/2018 [Sup Ct, NY Cnty] (settled, records turned over, attorneys fees paid)
Missouri Birth Index, 1920-2015; Missouri Death Index, 1968-2015	Missouri	Missouri Department of Health and Senior Services	Brooke Schreier Ganz, et al, v. Missouri Department of Health and Senior Services, No. 16AC-CC00503 [Cir Ct, Cole Cnty]

== Awards ==
Organization name	Award name	Award Year	Status
Federation of Genealogical Societies (FGS)	Director's Award	2017	Winner
International Association of Jewish Genealogical Societies (IAJGS)	Outstanding Project of the Year	2017	Winner
International Association of Jewish Genealogical Societies (IAJGS)	John Stedman Memorial Grant Recipient	2017	Winner
Electronic Frontier Foundation (EFF)	The Foilies Award	2017	Winner*
Investigative Reporters and Editors (IRE/NICAR)	The Golden Padlock Award	2017	Finalist*

*awarded to the Missouri Department of Health and Senior Services, due to information uncovered during Reclaim The Records' Sunshine Law requests and subsequent lawsuit against the agency

== See also ==
- Freedom of information
- Information activism
- MuckRock
- Open data
