= Shadowstats.com =

Website that publishes economic data for the United States

ShadowStats.com
- Website type: Analyses Government Economic & Unemployment Statistics
- Headquarters: Petaluma, CA - USA
- Owner: Walter John Williams
- Website: shadowstats.com
- Current status: Online

Shadowstats.com is a website that analyzes and offers alternatives to government economic statistics for the United States. Shadowstats primarily focuses on inflation, but also keeps track of the money supply, unemployment and GDP by utilizing methodologies abandoned by previous administrations from the Clinton era to the Great Depression.

The site is authored by consulting economist Walter J. Williams, who holds a BA in economics and an MBA from Dartmouth College. He is popularly known as "John Williams."

The website's claims have come under serious criticisms from economists and experts citing the implausibility of Williams' numbers.

== Claims ==
Shadowstats is perhaps best known for its alternative inflation statistics. Williams says that major changes to the Consumer Price Index were made between 1997 and 1999 in an effort to reduce Social Security outlays, using controversial changes by Alan Greenspan that include "hedonic regression", or the increased quality of goods. Some other investors have echoed Williams' views, most prominently Bill Gross, who reportedly called the U.S. CPI an "haute con job". John S. Greenlees and Robert B. McClelland, staff economists at the U.S. Bureau of Labor Statistics, wrote a paper to address CPI misconceptions, such as those of Williams.

Williams points out that under President Lyndon B. Johnson, the U-3 unemployment rate series was created, which excludes people who stopped looking for work for more than a year ago as well as part-time workers who are seeking full-time employment. Although the old unemployment rate series', which include part-time workers looking for full-time work and unemployed who stopped looking over a year ago, is still published monthly by BLS, the U-3 series is generally considered more meaningful and is the headline rate picked up by most media outlets. Williams calculates the U-6 rate as it was calculated until December 1993.

Shadowstats also tracks alternative growth statistics, and Williams has characterized the official numbers for U.S. Gross Domestic Product (GDP) and jobs growth range as "deceptive", “rigged", and "manipulated".

On July 24, 2008, Williams testified before the United States House Committee on Financial Services on the "Implications of a Weaker Dollar for Oil Prices and the U.S. Economy."

== Reception ==
=== Positive ===
Economist and former Assistant Secretary of the Treasury for Economic Policy Paul Craig Roberts has cited John Williams' estimates in a review of unemployment rates in 2013. Williams' work has also been cited by author Wayne Allyn Root. Williams has been featured on Fox Business Network and his work has been cited by CNBC.

=== Negative ===
A number of economists and finance experts have claimed that the Shadowstats CPI is conceptually wrong and that their usage leads to easily disproven and absurd conclusions.

University of Maryland Professor Katharine Abraham, who previously headed the Bureau of Labor Statistics, the agency responsible for publishing official unemployment and inflation data, says of Williams' claims about data manipulation that "[t]he culture of the Bureau of Labor Statistics is so strong that it's not going to happen." Steve Landefeld, former director of the Bureau of Economic Analysis, the Commerce Department agency that prepares quarterly GDP reports, said in response to an article about Williams, "the bureau rigorously follows guidelines designed to ensure its work remains totally transparent and absolutely unbiased." In the same article, UC San Diego economist Valerie Ramey, a member of the Federal Economic Statistics Advisory Committee, defended the methodological changes, claiming they were only made "after academic economists did decades of research and said they should be done."

Senior Fellow of the Niskanen Center Ed Dolan has found these alternatives to be "implausibly high" in spite of potential errors in the official data, especially when cross checked with data on nominal interest rates and physical output. Shadowstats measure of inflation has also been unfavorably compared with alternative private measures such as the Billions Prices Project which tracks millions of online retail prices from around the world in real time. In addition, despite claims of much higher inflation than official reports suggest, and even potential hyperinflation in the future, Shadowstats has not changed its $175 per year subscription fee since at least 2006, leading some to humor its own claims.

Responding to prior criticisms made by economist James Hamilton, John Williams explained in a private phone call that Shadowstats does not actually recalculate BLS data, rather, the Shadowstats CPI merely adds a constant to the officially reported numbers.

I’m not going back and recalculating the CPI. All I’m doing is going back to the government’s estimates of what the effect would be and using that as an add factor to the reported statistics.

By 2021, the cumulative estimates of ShadowStats imply an average annual inflation rate of 9% for a cumulative increase in prices of over 600% since 2000. In a phone interview with Timothy B. Lee, Lee asked Williams three different times for a particular good or service whose price increased by 6 fold over that time. Williams could not recall any saying, "I can't give you a real hard example."

== See also ==
- Bureau of Labor Statistics
- Inflation
- MIT Billion Prices Project
