= WeRelate =

WeRelate.org
- Website type: Family history
- Available in: English
- Owner: Foundation for On-Line Genealogy
- Creator: Dallan Quass
- Website: WeRelate.org
- Commercial: No
- Registration: Yes
- Users: 110,770 (May 2020)
- Launched: 2006; 20 years ago
- Current status: Active
- Content license: Creative Commons Attribution-ShareAlike License

WeRelate.org is an American wiki genealogy Web site that provides genealogy tools and data. WeRelate is a nonprofit organization, funded by tax-deductible donations, and is managed by unpaid volunteers. WeRelate had over 2 million person pages by March 2011 and claimed to be the "world's largest genealogy wiki".

WeRelate is supported by the Foundation for On-Line Genealogy and the Allen County Public Library in Fort Wayne, Indiana. The site runs on the MediaWiki software.

== Background ==
The site and software were developed in 2005 by the Foundation for On-Line Genealogy, led by president Dallan Quass, and subsequently launched in the spring of 2006 with the help of Solveig Quass. WeRelate is partnered with the Allen County Public Library, Genealogy Department Indiana, which houses one of the world's largest physical collections of genealogical materials. WeRelate has been listed in the top 101 websites for genealogy by Family Tree Magazine from 2008 through 2013, and listed among the "best family tree and sharing websites" 2023 listing also from this publisher.

In 2007, WeRelate and the University of South Florida's Africana Heritage Project launched a research project on slave genealogy, supported by South Carolina's Magnolia Plantation Foundation, including the resulting data in the global genealogy collection.

== Organization ==
WeRelate encourages users to upload GEDCOM (.ged) files, each person listed in the file being allocated a new person page on the wiki. The system produces a comparison screen for likely candidates, allowing users to determine if subjects are the same person; duplicate pages for common ancestors can be merged at upload. Information about living people is not accepted; it is automatically replaced by the software with the word "Living".

Registered users are able to document their research, which can then be edited by anyone else. WeRelate has over 926,000 Source pages which contain reference and access information along with relevant links. Source pages also provide space for review and research tips. Users may link Person and Family pages to any relevant source pages. Users may also create MySource pages for references relevant to only their research, such as family bibles, birth, death, and marriage certificates. Scans of documentation may be attached to any relevant page.

Place information is essential to genealogical research. WeRelate has over 900,000 referenced place pages. Where applicable, Place pages are linked to Family History Library Catalog, and Wikipedia. Where geographic coordinates are available, a Google map is provided. Many pages also include timelines, population history, contained places, history, research tips and images.

Compared to other projects that let people publish and share similar data, WeRelate focuses on sourcing files with links to primary genealogy records, and rather than letting users maintain separate personal family trees, aims to align data from different sources into a unified global record.

=== Collaborative tools ===
WeRelate includes a family tree explorer, annotated images for sharing images of primary source documents or photos, and generates pedigree maps of up to five generations of data.
