= Thomas Chesney =

British-Irish computational social scientist

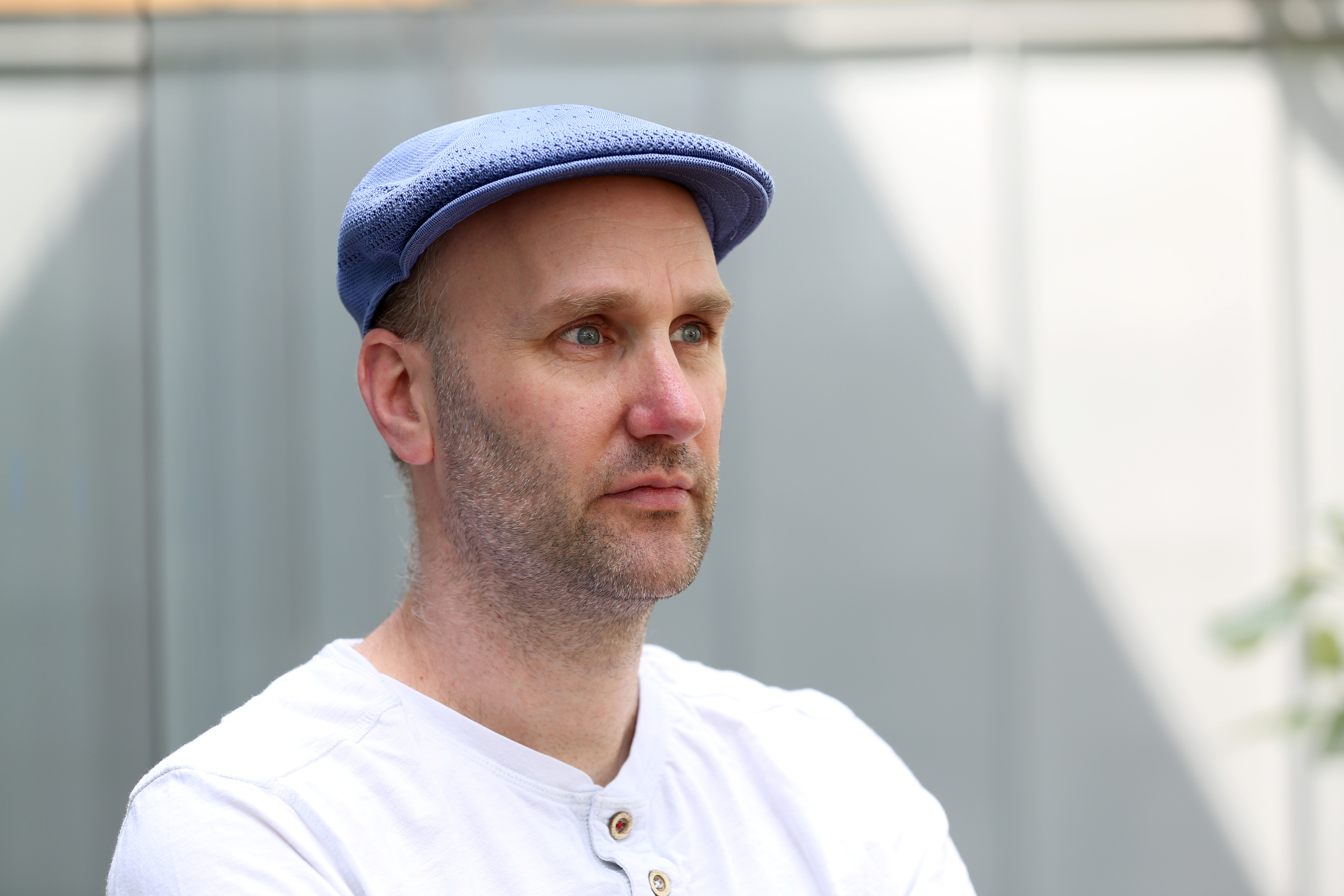
Thomas Chesney at the University of Nottingham, 2017.

Thomas Chesney is a British–Irish Professor of computational social science at Nottingham University Business School.

Born in Northern Ireland, Chesney uses simulation to study economic behaviour such as the problem of modern slavery. He is also the coauthor of the textbook Principles of Business Information Systems.
