= Rodovid =

Genealogy website

Rodovid.org
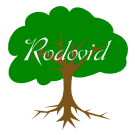
- Website type: Family history
- Available in: 25 languages
- Creator: Jarosław Boychuk
- Website: rodovid.org
- Commercial: No
- Registration: Yes
- Users: 12,634 in English localisation (August 2013)
- Launched: 20 May 2005; 21 years ago
- Current status: Active
- Content license: Creative Commons Attribution License

Rodovid is a free online collaborative family tree portal. Originally a Ukrainian project, as of 2023 it had active communities in 25 languages. It provides a web service built using MediaWiki and its own Rodovid Engine software to help store and visualize family relationships.

== About the project ==
Rodovid was founded in September 2005 by a group of developers and genealogy enthusiasts in Kyiv, Ukraine. The name comes from the Ukrainian word rodovid, meaning "lineage" or "genealogy". As of January 2019, Rodovid had over 1,055,000 total records for individuals across all languages, including over 590,000 in Ukrainian and Russian. Some sources claim that it the second largest free genealogy service online, and the largest in any language other than English. However, the Roglo database seems much larger. It seems that Rodovid is the largest genealogy website under a free license and accessible without restriction.

In 2016, Rodovid is ranked #82 in "Top 100 Genealogy Websites of 2016" of GenealogyInTime Magazine.

=== Data storage and export ===
It has experimented with supporting imports of GEDCOM files. Its Engine software is proprietary, but there have been discussions of releasing it openly. It supports layouts of family trees optimised for browsing and for printing, and claims it can generate trees of thousands of people in seconds.

The Rodovid project's data and descriptions are stored on servers in Kyiv, and available under the Creative Commons Attribution license where not already in the public domain. Its data is periodically archived by the WikiTeam project at the Internet Archive.
