= Mundhir Qabbānī =

Monther AlKabbani
- منذر القباني
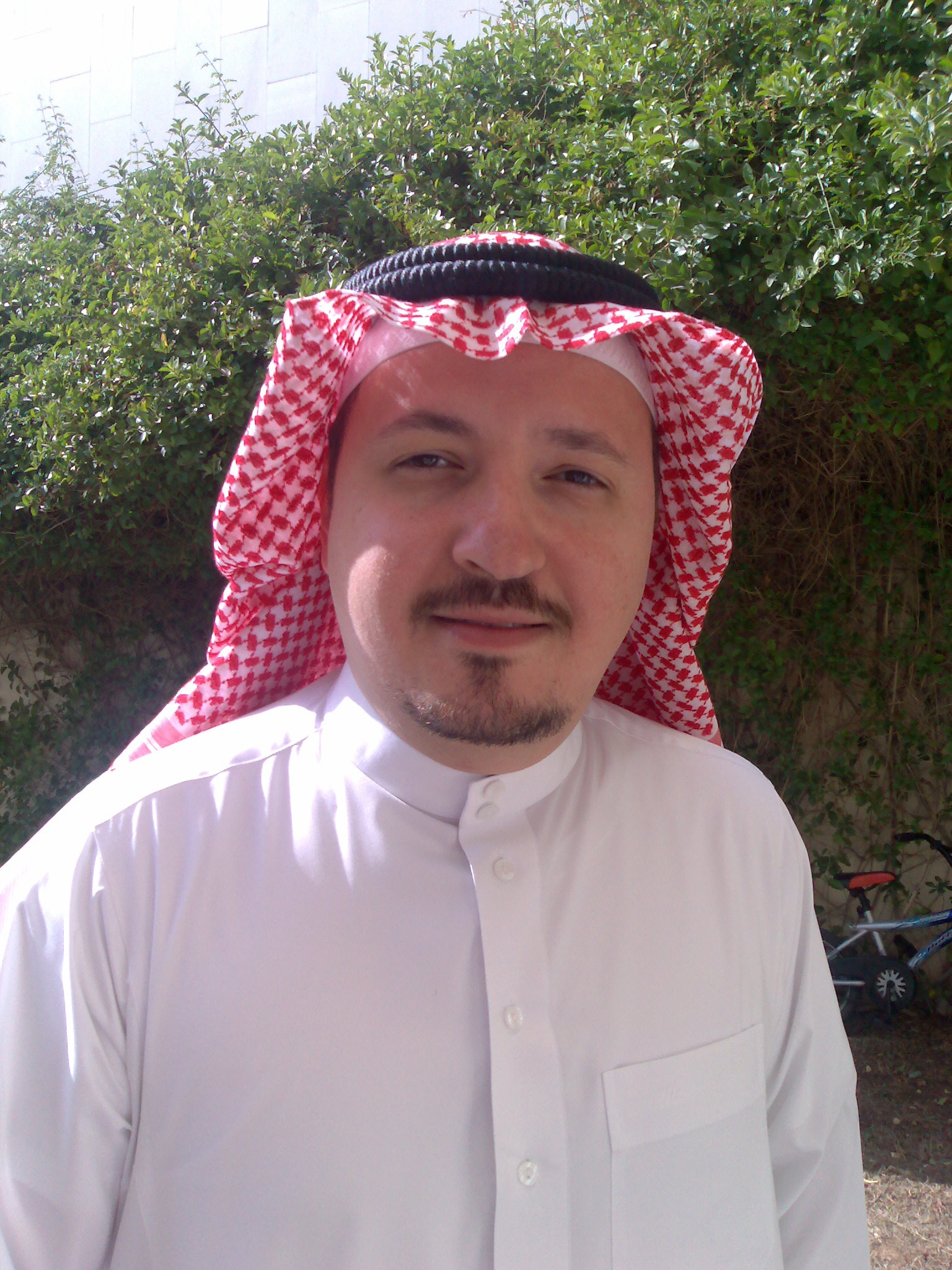
- Born: 11 October 1970 (age 56); Jeddah
- Education: Bachelors Degree in Medicine
- Alma mater: King Saud University; University of Toronto
- Occupations: Writer, Novelist and Surgeon
- Writing career
- Language: Arabic
- Genres: Thriller, Literature, Fiction, & Historical Fiction
- Notable works: The Shadow of Government; Return of the Absentee; Warriors and Warlocks Trilogy

Dr. Monther Al Kabbani (Arabic: منذر القباني) (born 10 November 1970), also known as Monzer al-Qabbani, is a Saudi Arabian writer, novelist, and surgeon born in Riyadh. He is known for his seven bestselling Arabic novels which include The Shadow Government (2006) and Warriors Warlocks Trilogy.

Qabbānī was born to a Saudi Arabian family from Al Madinah.

== Education ==
Qabbānī finished his bachelor's degree in medicine at King Saud University in 1993, and pursued his surgical training in Canada, where he finished his general surgical residency at the University of Toronto in 2001.

In 2003, he earned his certificate in the field of specialisation revolving upon liver, pancreatic and bile canal surgeries from British Columbia University in Vancouver.

He went further to train in hepatobiliary and pancreatic surgery at the University of British Columbia from 2001 until 2003.

== Career ==
Qabbānī gave numerous health and cultural lectures in several cities. He also has a collection of research papers published in a number of medical journals.

Furthermore, he has published various cultural articles in Saudi newspapers.

In 2006, he published his first novel in Arabic The Shadow of Government which established him as one of the top selling novelists in the Arab world, and started the genre of intellectual thriller in Arabic literature. This was followed by his second novel, Return of the Absentee, in 2008.

In 2012 he published his third novel, Outcast, part one of the Warriors and Warlocks trilogy. Part two, Qotoz, came out August 2014, and was followed by part three "Qareen" in 2016.

== Publications ==
=== Novels ===
- 2006: Hokomat Alzel, (Arabic: حكومة الظل, "The Shadow of Government")
- 2008: Awdat Alghaeb, (Arabic: عودة الغائب, "Return of the Absentee")
- 2012: Forsan Wa Kahana, (Arabic: فرسان وكهنة, "Knights and Priests", translated into English by Timothy Gregory as Warriors and Warlocks Chapter One: Outcast in 2019)
- 2014: Qutuz, (Arabic: قطز, translated into English by Timothy Gregory as Warriors and Warlocks Chapter Two: Qutuz in 2021)
- 2016: Qareen, (Arabic: قرين, translation into English by Timothy Gregory as Warriros and Warlocks Chapter Three: Shadow coming in 2022)
- 2018: Zawja Waheda La Takfe... Zawj waheid Katheer, (Arabic: !زوجة واحدة لا تكفي... زوج واحد كثير، "One Wife is not Enough... One Husband Is too Many!")
- 2019: Saed Alsaherat, (Arabic: صائد الساحرات, "The Witch Hunter")

== Quotes ==
- "There is no harder way to go than that which leads to the truth!"
- "It is said that time is conducive to healing all wounds, but there is a simple condition; the wound should not be disclosed"
- "The reality of things may not necessarily be how they look from the outside"

== Reviews ==
Pointing out to one of his novels, a review on AlJazeera describes Al Kabbani's writing style as the one that creates historical epics mixing between the past and present, where he tends to move his characters throughout.

Furthermore, the review mentioned how he makes a memory lively once again through mixing the storytelling with reality plots at the same time.

On the other hand, speaking of his other novels, Mohammed Al-Hawimel, discussed how he tends to stir towards the portrayal of symbolism throughout his plots, along with its scientific and literary intersections.
