= MIT Billion Prices project =

Real-time inflation estimate from MIT

The Billion Prices Project (BPP) was an academic initiative at MIT Sloan and Harvard Business School that used prices collected from hundreds of online retailers around the world daily to conduct research in macro and international economics and compute real-time inflation metrics. It was started in 2008 by professors Alberto Cavallo and Roberto Rigobon.

The project is no longer active, and it has published datasets that run from 2007 through to 2020.

== History ==
In 2007, the BPP initiated Inflación Verdadera, a project that provided a daily inflation gauge for Argentina, serving as an alternative to the official consumer price index which was manipulated by the government during 2007-2016. Within the same framework, in May 2017 the BPP began experimenting with crowd-sourcing and mobile technologies to measure the monthly inflation rate in Venezuela where official statistics haven’t been published since 2015.

Recent research projects include, for example, the study of how offline pricing behavior is being affected by the web, mobile browsing and price-checking technologies. Other recent research makes use of online prices to construct quarterly purchasing power parities that could provide real-time estimates of real consumption across countries without the need for consumer price index extrapolations across both developing and developed countries.

The BPP monitored daily price fluctuations of ~15 million items sold by +1000 online retailers in more than 70 countries.

== Awards ==
In 2018, the BPP won the "Economics in Central Banking Award"
