= Serbian Genealogical Society =

Learned society in Serbia

The Serbian Genealogical Society (Serbian: Српско родословно друштво / Srpsko rodoslovno društvo) is a learned society that is engaged in genealogical research in Serbia and the Balkan Peninsula.

== History, purpose and activities ==
The society was established in 2002, and is the successor of the Serbian Genealogical Foundation. The society is devoted to establishing genealogical infrastructure in Serbia. Members of the foundation, together with other researchers in the region, created the SGS for the promotion of genealogy in its broadest sense. The society strives for objective research and is not engaged in political activities, which it is prohibited from doing under its own statutes. Its founding members are: Sergei Oudman, Danica Radisic and Zeljko Jovanovic.

Article 2 of the statutes state

- The society’s goal is to promote and stimulate genealogy and related sciences in the broadest sense of the word in Serbia-Montenegro and the rest of the region. To supply resources both online and offline for the general public and members.
- To assist the archives in promoting and assisting in genealogical research in the broadest sense of the word.
- The creation of genealogical databases in cooperation with the Archives of Serbia and other related institutes in accordance with the law of the state of Serbia.
- The society does not have a financial gain and serves the general interest; it therefore remains politically independent, and will provide in objective research.
- The society can not accept donations from political institutes that can jeopardize the independent and objective status of the society.
- The society is not affiliated with any church or religious denomination, in order to maintain its objectivity.
- To assist in reuniting families that have been scattered due to the civil war in the former-Yugoslavia.
- The society also provides for humanitarian aid in the broadest sense of the word.

The SGS is not a learned society although many of its members are. Members of the society include historians, sociologists, ethnologists, genealogists, and researchers, as well as amateur genealogists. The SGS has close ties with different archives in Serbia and abroad and other similar organizations. These include:

- National Archives of Serbia
- National Archives of Montenegro
- Macedonian Heraldic Society
- Slovenian Genealogical Society
- Slovakian Genealogical & Heraldic Society
- Croatian Heritage Museum (USA)

A primary goal of the SGS is to provide genealogical tools for those want to know more about their family heritage. The SGS runs an online presentation through its official website, which also provides forums, research tools, and allows people to post their family tree online for free through a system called “Moj Rodoslov”. This is done in accordance with the privacy laws in Serbia. The SGS is also responsible for a validation and accreditation programme to ensure proper quality of research inside Serbia.

== Serbian Heraldic Society ==
The Serbian Society for Heraldry, Genealogy, Vexillology and Phaleristics, also known as the Serbian Heraldry Society, was established in 1991. The society is the only professional organisation of that kind in Serbia. It is involved in research and work in the fields of heraldry, genealogy, flags, medals and honours, and the more specialized fields of insigniology, archontology and nobilistics.

The White Eagle is responsible for Serbia and Montenegro's heraldic arms registry, including responsibility for the design and drawing of the Coats of Arms for most of the states and cities of Serbia.

== Branches ==
The SGS has different branches in Belgrade, Kruševac, Bosnia, Vojvodina, the Netherlands, and the United States. All branches have their own commissions.

== Archives ==
The SGS provides information about the available archival resources and assists people in accessing the archival resources. Serbia, unlike neighbouring countries like Croatia, has no microfilmed archives. This makes archival work more difficult. The SGS works with archives in Serbia to make them more accessible while ensuring that archival documents are properly preserved.

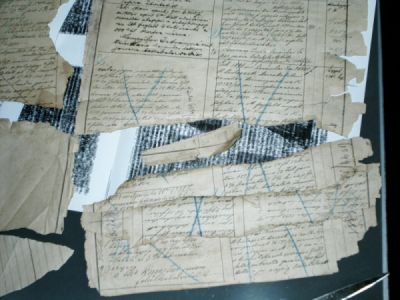
State of archives

== Sources ==
- Library of Congress
- World Library & Information Congress 2009 Retrieved 09-04-2009
- Consulate General of the Republic of Serbia - New York
- White Eagle arms registry index; Nevesinjska 7, 11000 Belgrade, Serbia
- National Archives of Serbia, Karnegija 2, 11000 Belgrade, Serbia
- Official Government Website of the state of Serbia
- Official website of HRH Karadjordjevic; Section Heritage
- Vecerne Novosti article
