= Styling Garage =

Styling Garage (also known as SGS) is (closed and reopened) a coachbuilder and tuner (actually in Relligen) near Hamburg, Germany, which operated from 1979 until 1986 and then reopened (working in 2025). SGS made extravagant and expensive designs, mainly based on the Mercedes-Benz W126 (S-class). More than half of their buyers came from the Arab world, with the remainder consisting mostly of American celebrities, Japanese businessmen, and African leaders.

== History ==
The establishment was founded by Peter Engel and Christian "Chris" Hahn (a ship engineer by training), although Engel soon left. The company was originally a repair shop in Pinneberg, a Hamburg suburb, but Hahn began converting a few Mercedes into limousines. This side of the business grew quickly, and Hahn received a contract to convert 40 S-class Mercedes to limousines in all the colors of the rainbow for the 1981 wedding of Hamad bin Hamdan Al Nahyan from Abu Dhabi, known as the Rainbow Sheik. Other regular clients included the Sultan of Brunei and King Fahd of Saudi Arabia. The business grew quickly, and in 1984 and 1985 the firm had 100 employees and also used several subcontractors to carry out conversions. In particular Wille Karosseriebau, a body builder of trucks, buses, and trailers in Seevetal, carried out many jobs for SGS.

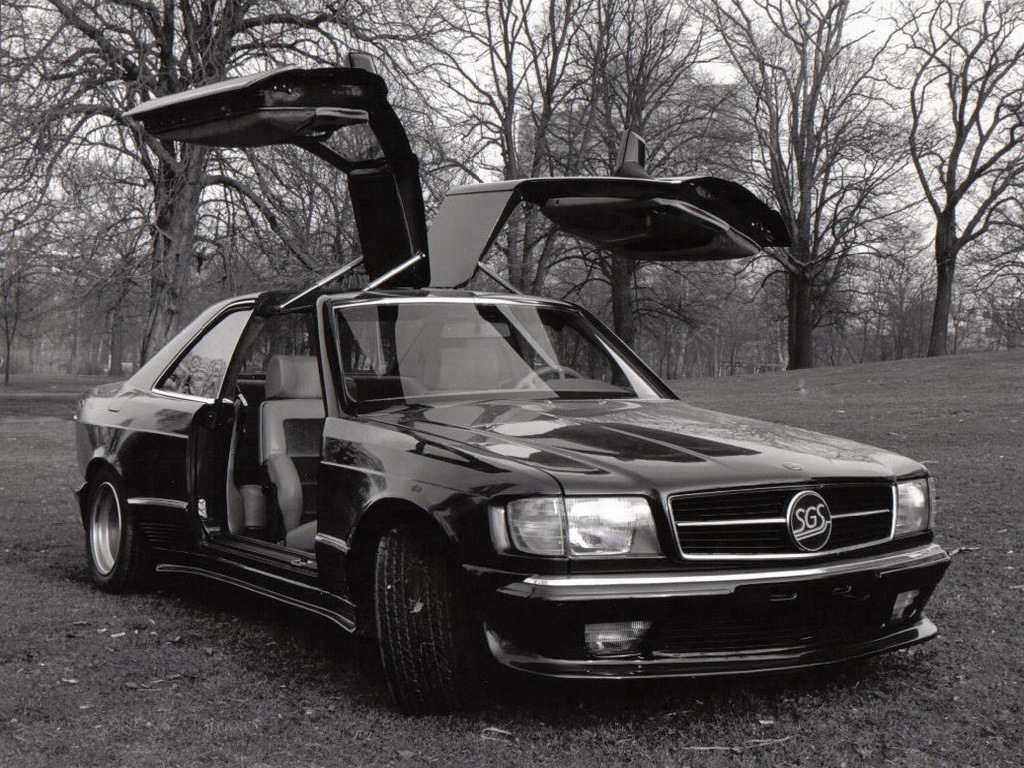
Styling Garage 500 SEC Gullwing

By February 1986, however, the picture had changed and Styling Garage declared bankruptcy, with debts of 1.5 million Deutsche Mark. There were several reasons for the sudden change in the company's fortunes: the devaluation of the US dollar harmed German exports there, while Saudi Arabia passed a law in 1985 limiting the import of modified vehicles - import dropped by half. There had also been a rapid growth in the custom-car market, with many new competitors, some of less scrupulous nature. SGS themselves also received negative publicity, after two ex-employees claimed that the company neglected to install hot-weather packages and having rigged temperature gauges to not show higher engine temperatures. ABS brakes were disconnected, and cheap tires were installed that did not have the required speed ratings. SGS admitted to having done some of these things, but always at the direct request of buyers.

Hahn went on to found a new company, Design & Technik, in 1987. They also converted Mercedes-Benz automobiles and also did some jobs for automobile manufacturers. Design & Technik also used the SGS brand at times. One of their models was a four-seat convertible based on the Mercedes-Benz 300 CE. As with the earlier 320 SGS, Mercedes themselves soon introduced such a version. Design & Technik continued to offer limousine and convertible versions of a variety of cars, such as the Acura Legend, BMW 850 CSi, and Mercedes-Benz C140. They also executed the two Volkswagen Corrado Magnum shooting brakes developed by Marold Automobil in 1989 with the intent of limited series production. The company ceased trading in 2007.

== Models ==
While Styling Garage offered rarefied versions of the entire Mercedes-Benz range, they are most famous for the 1000 SEL. This name was coined when a buyer exclaimed that his modified 500 SEL "was at least twice as good as the 500 SEL he began with." That name had to be changed to 1000 SGS after legal action was threatened by Daimler-Benz. SGS stood for "Styling Garage Special." These were flashy models, based on the US-spec 500 SEL, equipped with sport wheels, custom interiors, special bumpers, wing kits, and much more. The US-style headlights and bumpers marked the 1000 SGS as different from the 500 SGS. The stretched versions of the S-class were sometimes badged 600 SGS or 800 SGS, when stretched by 600 or 800 mm (24 or 31 in) respectively. These have specially developed rear doors, without the cutout for the wheel well. In the last year of operations Styling Garage presented the 600 SGS Royale, a version of the 560 SEL widened by 200 mm (7.9 in). This also necessitated a new rear axle, while the classic grille was redesigned to fit the wider body. The Royale was also stretched, from 300 to 1,200 mm (12 to 47 in). Six were built, with the Sultan of Brunei having bought three of them.

The 1000 SGS were often stretched as well, as much as 1,000 mm (39 in). SGS' other famous effort was the Gullwing, a version of the 500/560 SEC equipped with gullwing doors. 57 Gullwings are reported to have been built from 1982. The Gullwing naturally had to be strengthened considerably, and had a discrete B-pillar mounted inside the cabin to help support the heavy doors. The price of the conversion in 1985 (without styling extras) was about the same as the cost of the car itself. Aside from the Arab world, several were sold to the United States, where buyers included comedian Eddie Murphy.

Other S-class variants included a five-door station wagon variant and a two-door full convertible with an electro-hydraulically operated roof, called the "Marbella". As with all of Styling Garage's creations, no expense was spared and the wagon's rear doors had a unique profile to match the new roofline. Styling Garage's first 500 SEC convertible was finished in 1982.

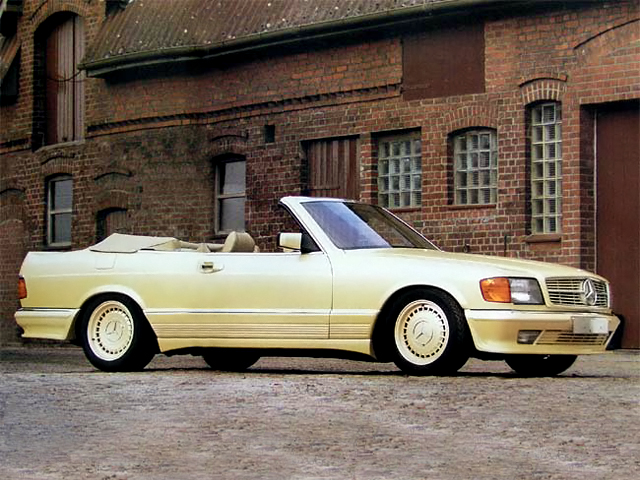
The SEC-based SGS Marbella Cabriolet

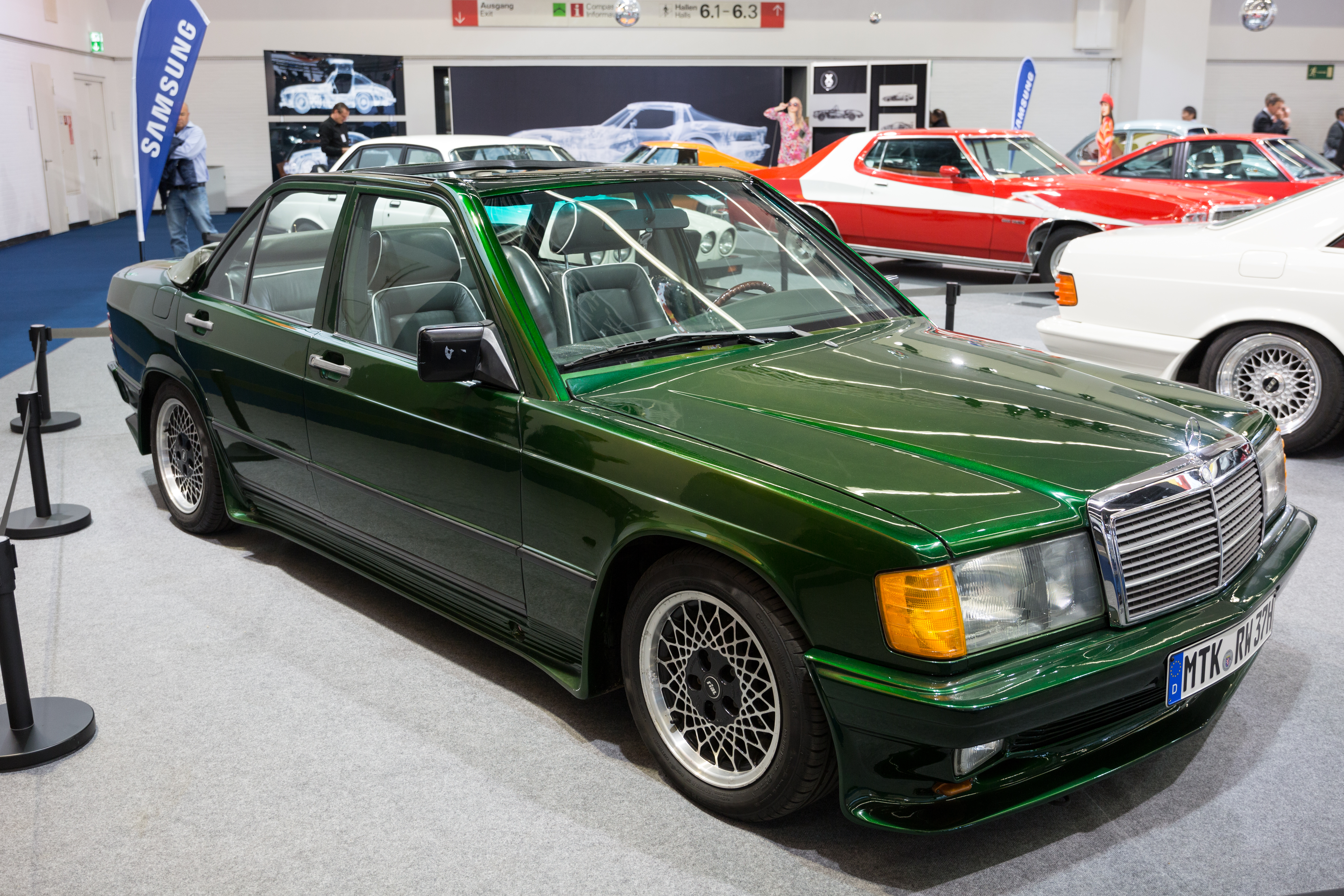
Mercedes-Benz 190 SGS St. Tropez - one of two built

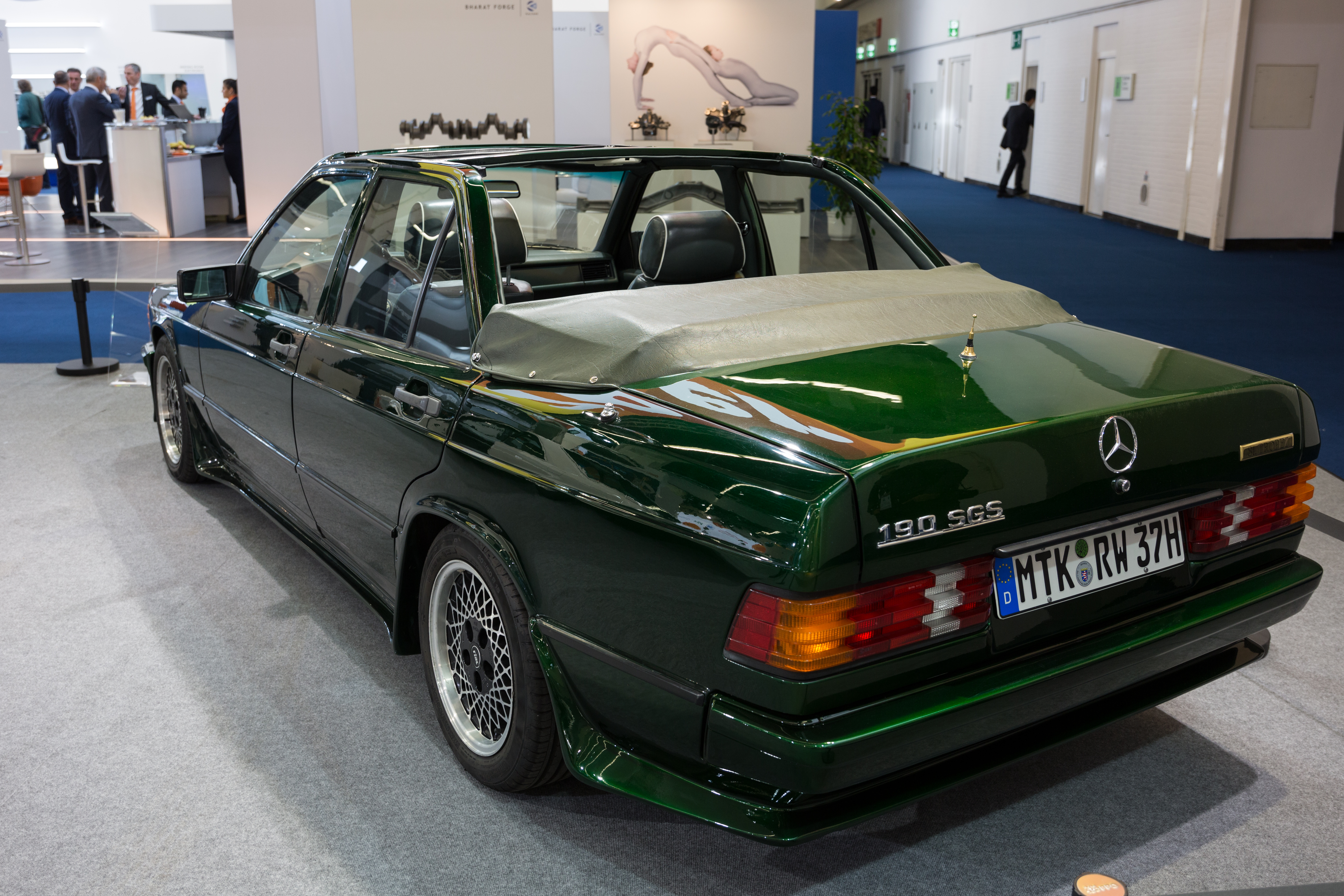
Rear view

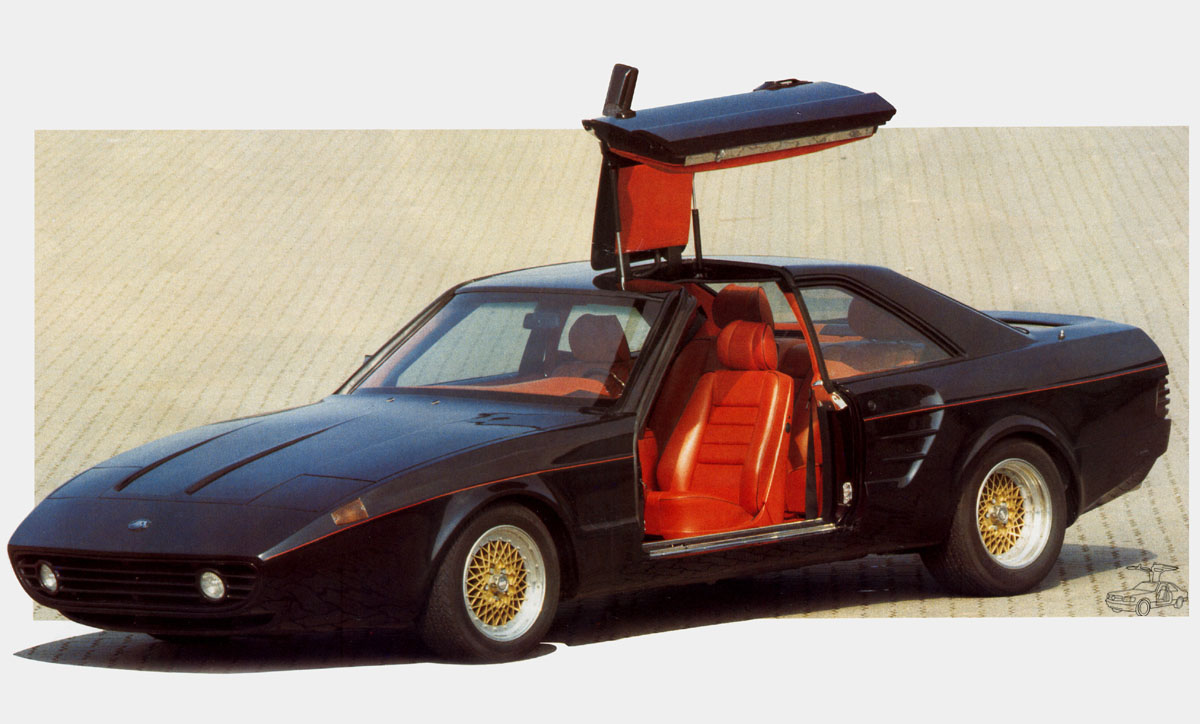
SGS Arrow C1 Gullwing, based on a Mercedes-Benz 500 SEC

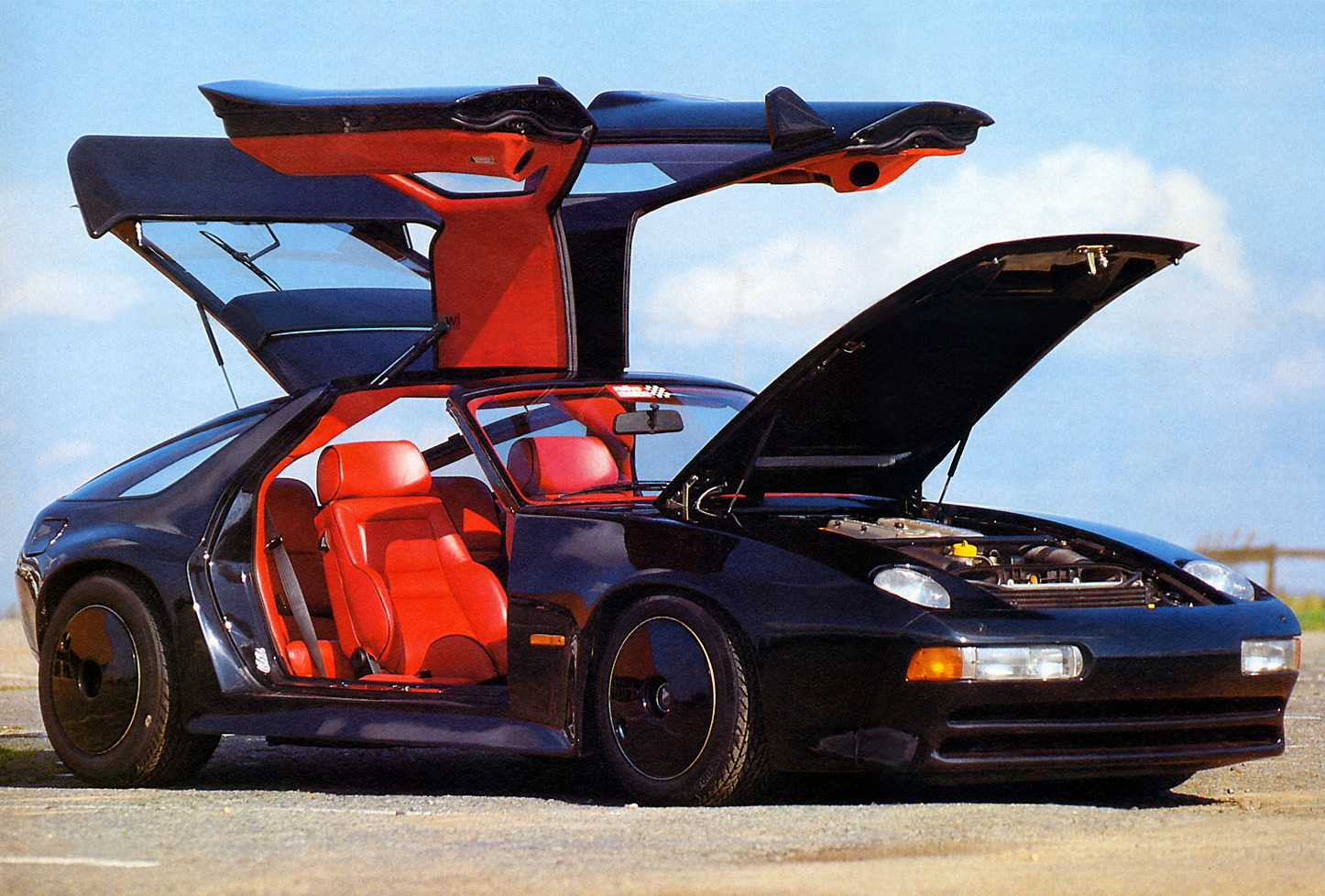
Porsche 928 S4 Gullwing by Styling Garage

There was also a "flatnose" version of the Gullwing, originally created for an American buyer and called the Arrow C1. The nose was stretched, akin to that of the Plymouth Superbird, although it also echoed the design of the Mercedes-Benz C111. The new nose had flip-up headlights and the radiator was now mounted lying down. It also received a full body kit (partially made from kevlar) with shaved bumpers and faux air intakes ahead of the rear wheels. In 1985, a similar flatnose version of the C126 convertible was shown; it was called the SGS Arrow II.

Styling Garage also offered a convertible version of the BMW 3-series, called the 320 SGS. This model, unlike the one presented by BMW themselves at the 1985 Frankfurt Motor Show, has a rollbar fitted. As usual, they also offered a range of design accessories, wing kits, wheels, etcetera. BMW's in-house convertible 3-series arrived in 1985 and made this conversion mostly redundant.
