= Robert C. Elston =

- Born: 4 February 1932 (age 94); London
- Known for: The Elston–Stewart algorithm and Haseman–Elston regression
- Scientific career
- Fields: Statistical genetics
- Institutions: Louisiana State University Medical School, Case Western Reserve University

Robert C. Elston (born 4 February 1932) is a British born statistical geneticist and distinguished professor emeritus at Case Western Reserve University. He is one of the eponyms of the Elston–Stewart algorithm and Haseman–Elston regression.

== Life ==
Elston was born in London, England in 1932.

In the 1970s he worked with John Stewart to create the Elston–Stewart algorithm which enables researchers to estimate the likelihood of genotype data given a pedigree.

In 1980s Elston was working at the Louisiana State University Medical School in New Orleans working on statistical genetics. Elston left LSU for Case Western Reserve University in Cleveland in 1995 taking other staff with him.

== Bibliography ==
- Johnson, William A.; Elston, Robert C. (2008). Basic Biostatistics for Geneticists and Epidemiologists: A Practical Approach. New York: Wiley. ISBN 978-0-470-02490-4.
- Danielle Fallin; Palmer, Lyle; Elston, Robert C. (2007). Genetic Epidemiology: Fundamental Concepts. New York: Wiley-Interscience. ISBN 978-0-470-85326-9.
- E. Ginsburg; I. Malkin; R.C. Elston (2006). Theoretical Aspects Of Pedigree Analysis. Ramot Publishing House. ISBN 965-274-424-7.
- Palmer, Lyle; Elston, Robert C.; Olson, Jane M. (2002). Biostatistical Genetics and Genetic Epidemiology. New York: Wiley. ISBN 0-471-48631-0.
- Johnson, William A.; Elston, Robert C. (1994). Essentials of Biostatistics. Philadelphia: Davis. ISBN 0-8036-3123-5.
- MacCluer, Jean Walters; Elston, Robert C. (1990). Multipoint Mapping and Linkage Based Upon Affected Pedigree Members: Genetic Analysis Workshop 6 (Progress in Clinical & Biological Resear). Chichester: John Wiley & Sons. ISBN 0-471-56692-6.
