= Access Genealogy =

Genealogy website

Access Genalogy is a genealogy website.

One specific specialty it has is "the 1835 Cherokee census, listing Cherokees who lived east of the Mississippi during that year." One reviewer's one-sentence summary is: "This has a lot to offer for a free site, but it's unlikely that you will discover anything new, unless you have a need for Native American resources."

This 1999-founded site was described as a "grab-bag of free genealogy records." It is also a source for African-American genealogy.

== See also ==
- Family tree
