= Michaël Eytzinger =

Austrian nobleman, diplomat, historian, and publicist

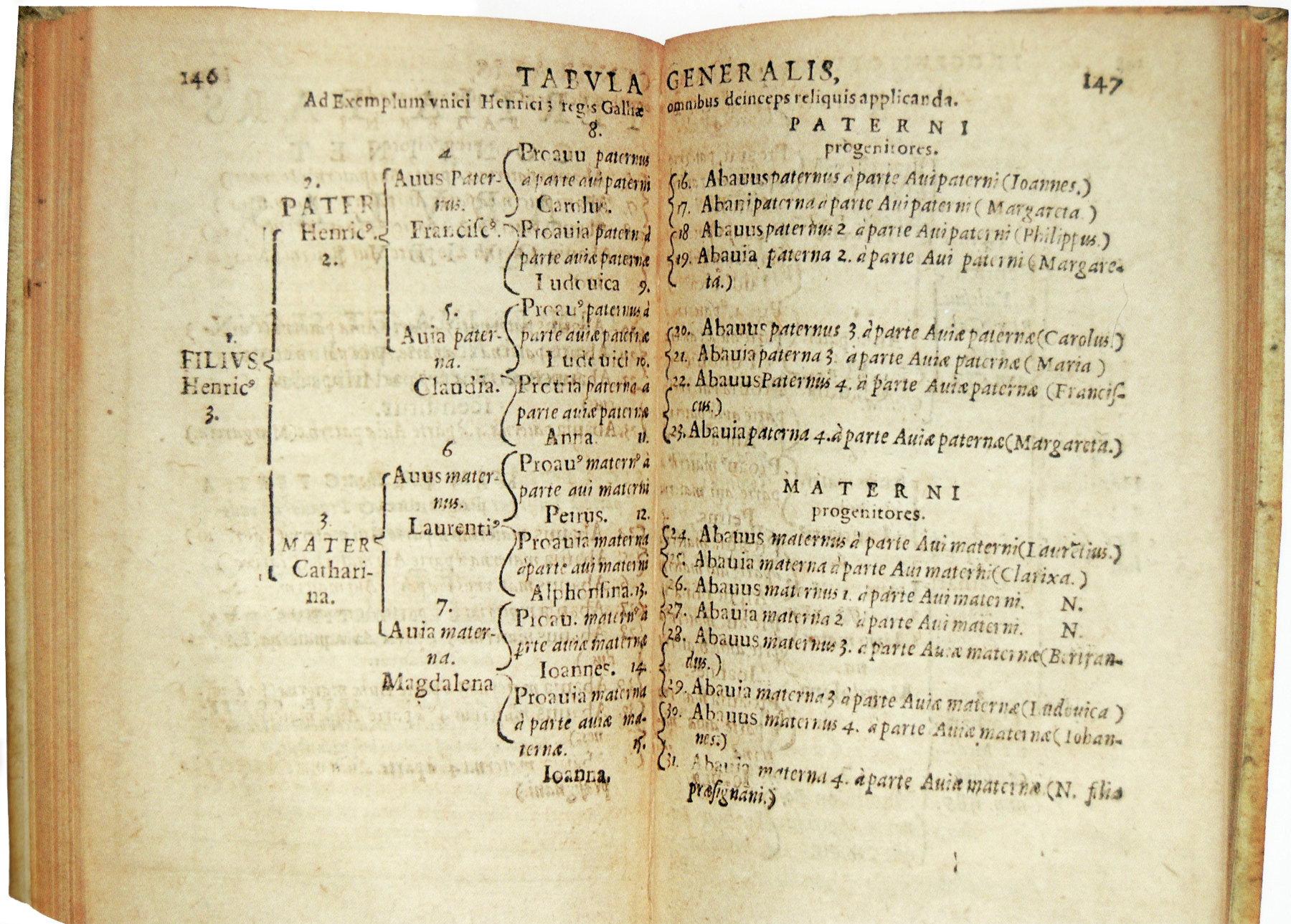
The first ahnentafel, published by Michaël Eytzinger in Thesaurus principum hac aetate in Europa viventium Cologne: 1590, pp. 146-147, in which Eytzinger first illustrates his new functional theory of numeration of ancestors; this schema showing Henry III of France as n° 1, de cujus, with his ancestors in five generations. The remainder of the volume shows 34 additional schemas for rulers and princes of Europe using his new method.

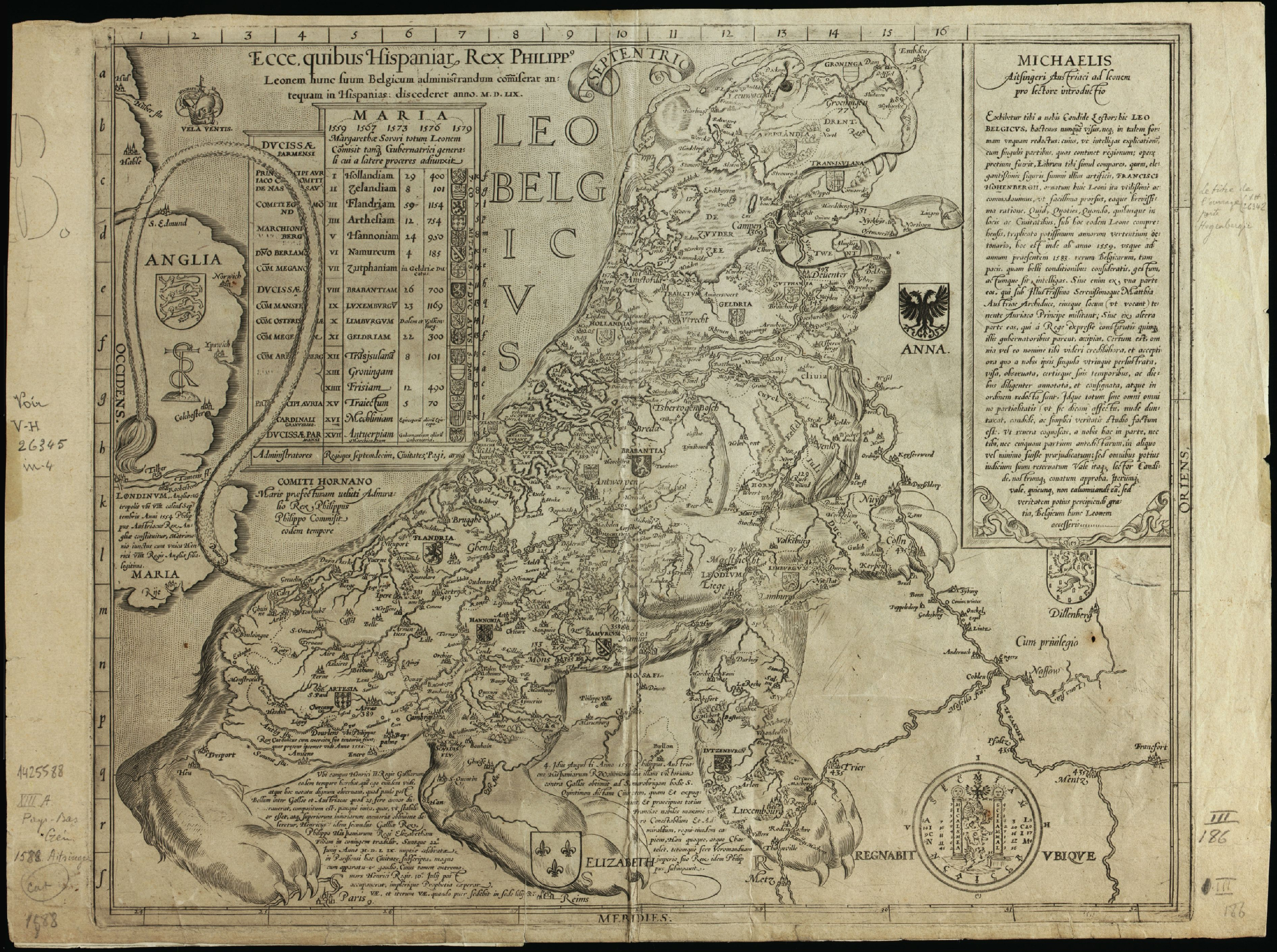
First representation of Leo Belgicus in a map of the Low Countries by Eytzinger & Hogenberg, published in 1583

Michaël Eytzinger (Freiherr Michael von Aitzing, Aitzinger, Eyzinger, or Eitzing) (born ca. 1530 in Obereitzing - died 1598 in Bonn), was an Austrian nobleman, diplomat, historian, and publicist, who wrote and published several works, including a renowned volume that states the principles of a genealogical numbering system, called an Ahnentafel, that is still in use today.

Eytzinger first published the Ahnentafel in 1590 in his Thesaurus principum hac aetate in Europa viventium (Cologne), in which he described and illustrated his new functional theory of numeration of ancestors by providing genealogies of thirty-four sovereign houses of Europe.

Eytzinger’s method was used by Jerónimo de Sosa, in his work Noticia de la gran casa de los marqueses de Villafranca in 1676, and was popularized by Stephan Kekulé von Stradonitz in his Ahnentafel-atlas in 1898.

He also wrote and published several histories, including Novus de Leone Belgico in 1583 that included the first cartographic representation of the Low Countries as Leo Belgicus. The lion motif was inspired by the heraldic figures that appear in the coats of arms of several Dutch constituencies, as well as in the arms of William of Orange. The map was published during the period when the Netherlands was fighting the Eighty Years' War for independence from Spain.

== Major works ==
- Novus de Leone Belgico eiusque topographica atque historica descriptione liber., 1583
- Relatio historica Köln, 1584
- Rerum vaticiniis accommodata historia: das ist eine Hystorische Beschreibung..., Köln, 1584
- Bipartita septem temporum historia: das ist historische Beschreybung sieben underscheidlicher Zeiten. Köln, 1586
- Thesaurus principum hac aetate in Europa viventium: quo progenitores eorum..., Köln, 1590

== See also ==
- Leo Belgicus
