= International Hedgehog Registry =

The International Hedgehog Registry is a registry for the hedgehog. It records the pedigrees of animals that have been registered, and makes the information available to scientists.

== History ==
The registry was established in 1997, and acquired by the International Hedgehog Association in 2002.. The UK have their own registry.
