= Stephan Kekulé von Stradonitz =

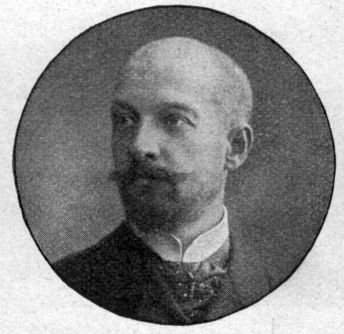
- Stephan Kekulé von Stradonitz (1904)
- Born: 1 May 1863; Ghent, Belgium
- Died: 5 May 1933 (aged 70); Berlin, Germany
- Occupation: Writer

Stephan Kekulé von Stradonitz (1 May 1863, in Ghent – 5 May 1933, in Berlin), was a German lawyer, heraldist and genealogist who popularized a genealogical numbering system of ancestors.

Stephan was the son of the prominent chemist Friedrich August Kekulé von Stradonitz, descended from a Czech noble family from Bohemia, and his Belgian wife Stéphanie Drory.

In 1898, Kekulé von Stradonitz published his interpretation of Eytzinger's and Sosa's method in his Ahnentafel-Atlas. Ahnentafeln zu 32 Ahnen der Regenten Europas und ihrer Gemahlinnen, Berlin: J. A. Stargardt, 1898–1904, containing 79 charts of the sovereigns of Europe and their wives. This method became the most common method of numbering ancestors and is known as the Sosa–Stradonitz Method or Ahnentafel.
