= Jerónimo de Sosa =

Jerónimo de Sosa also known as Hieronymus, Jerome or Geronimo de Sosa, was a 17th-century Spanish Franciscan friar and a genealogist who developed a genealogical numbering system of ancestors.

Sosa was a lector of theology at the royal monastery of Santa Maria la Nova in Naples. In his work Noticia de la gran casa de los marqueses de Villafranca in 1676, he used and popularized a method based on the numbering system first published by Michaël Eytzinger in 1590.

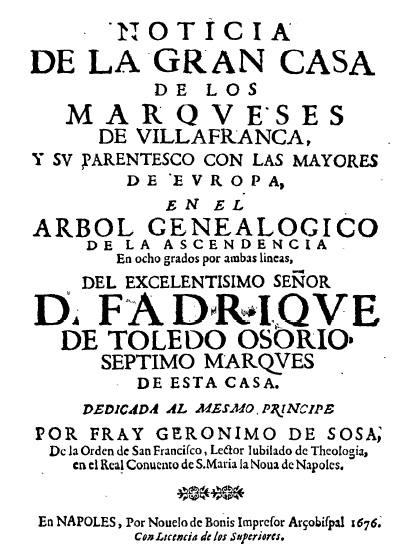
Noticia de la gran casa de los Marqueses de Villafranca, title page.

Sosa's method was popularized on a large scale by Stephan Kekulé von Stradonitz in his Ahnentafel-atlas in 1898 and became known as Ahnentafel or the Sosa–Stradonitz Method.

== Bibliography ==
- SOSA, Fray Jerónimo de, Noticia de la Gran Casa de los Marqueses de Villafranca, y su parentesco con las mayores de Europa, Novelo de Bonis, impresor arzobispal de Nápoles, 1676 (facsimile edition).
