= Mirror tree =

Family tree reconstructed through estimates of consanguinity

In genealogy, a mirror tree is a family tree reconstructed through estimates of consanguinity.
