= Haseman =

Haseman is a surname. Notable people with the surname include:

- Chris Haseman (born 1969), Australian mixed martial artist
- John Diederich Haseman (1882–1969), American zoologist and explorer
- Joseph K. Haseman, American toxicologist known for Haseman–Elston regression
- Mary Gertrude Haseman (1889–1979), American mathematician
- Vicki Brown (born Victoria Mary Haseman, 1940–1991), British singer
- William D. Haseman (1948-2019), American computer scientist

== See also ==
- Hageman (surname)
- Hasemania - a genus of fish name for John Diederich Haseman
- Haseman's gecko
- Haseman–Elston regression - a form of statistical regression originally proposed for linkage analysis of quantitative traits for sibling pairs.
