= Elston–Stewart algorithm =

The Elston–Stewart algorithm is an algorithm for computing the likelihood of observed data on a pedigree assuming a general model under which specific genetic segregation, linkage and association models can be tested. It is due to Robert Elston and John Stewart. It can handle relatively large pedigrees providing they are (almost) outbred. When used for linkage analysis its computation time is exponential in the number of markers, in contrast to the Lander-Green algorithm, which has computational time exponential in the number of pedigree members.
