= Familio =

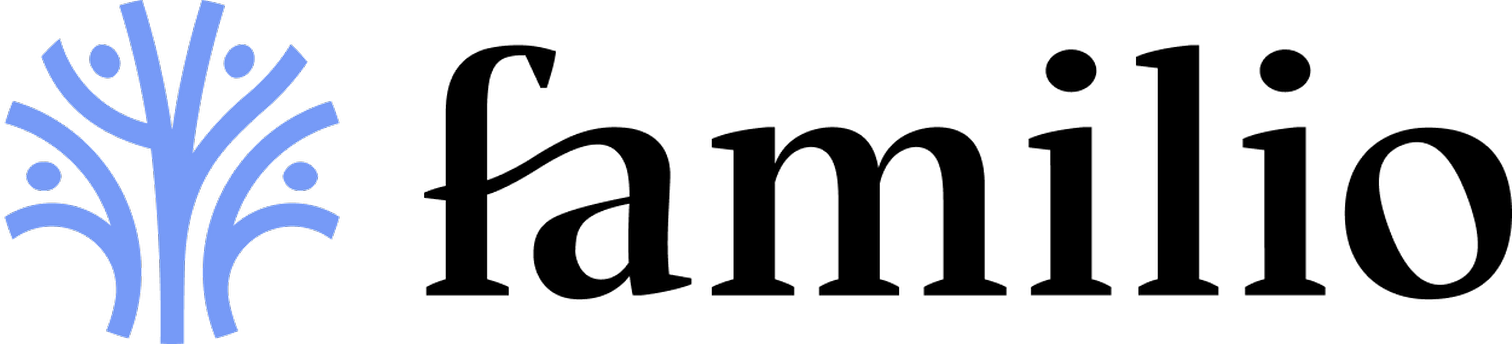
- Website type: Genealogy online service
- Available in: Russian
- Headquarters: Saint Petersburg, Russia
- Owner: Genealogical Systems LLC
- Website: familio.org
- Commercial: Yes
- Launched: 2021; 5 years ago
- Current status: Active

Familio is a Russian online service that allows users to build a family tree and also provides various auxiliary services and thematic databases.

== Project history ==
The website was launched on April 7, 2021 and initially contained four sections:

- People – genealogical profiles created by users.
- Places – contains information about populated areas in the post-Soviet space, with brief extracts from modern and historical settlement registers. The populated places database can be searched using both contemporary and pre-revolutionary administrative divisions.
- Surnames – provides brief onomastic information about the most common surnames in the post-Soviet space, as well as aggregated data on historical areas where these surnames were prevalent before 1917.
- Knowledge Base – this section was originally called "Archive Documents" and allowed linking genealogical tree profiles to information about various archival materials. At the same time, a "Directories" section was added, containing digitized collections listing various populated places that served as the basis for the "Places" section. By 2025, this section also included Familio.Media (the site's news section), indexing of historical documents, and profiles of other service users.

In 2022, a family tree builder was added. That same year, Familio began offering interpretation services for DNA tests performed by other companies; users became able to upload test data to the site for automatic matching with other users.

In 2023, an automatic tree-matching feature was launched. That year, the ability to import trees in GEDCOM format was added, followed by export functionality in 2024.

== Pricing policy ==
The site's pricing policy is based on the understanding that every user should be able to create an unlimited number of family tree profiles, view the tree in the tree builder, access the "Knowledge Base," and exchange messages. In the free version (Familio Standard), users have access to the tree builder without any limit on the number of added individuals, but the number of displayed descendants is limited to five generations. Searches in the "Knowledge Base" and "People" sections are unlimited. Viewing open tree data of other users is only available to registered users. With an active paid subscription (Familio Plus), users get access to automatic tree matching across all databases, can display up to 50 generations of descendants in the tree, and can add other users to their tree with editing rights.

== Audience and content reach ==
By April 2022, the site had 30,000 users and contained information about 287,000 populated places. By April 2024, 190,000 users were registered on the site; it contained 3.5 million individuals in their family trees and 11 million entries in the directories. By April 2025, the service reported over 500,000 users and 30 million individuals in family trees and databases.
