= Genogram =

Type of extended family tree

A genogram, also known as a family diagram, is a pictorial display of a person's position and ongoing relationships in their family's hereditary hierarchy. It goes beyond a traditional family tree by allowing the user to visualize social patterns and psychological factors that punctuate relationships, especially patterns that repeat over the generations.

== History ==
Georgetown Family Center Therapist Murray Bowen developed the concept of the genogram. At the time, he called it a "family diagram" as part of his family systems model in the 1970s. He claimed not to know where the concept of a genogram came from but nonetheless avowed that he didn't invent it.

In their 1980 book, The Family Life Cycle, Betty Carter and Monica McGoldrick included genograms on the book's cover and in a page regarding the genogram format; they were copyrighted to Bowen, who had been promoting the value of genograms in family systems work. The same year, Jack Bradt, a former student of Bowen's, published a pamphlet at the Groome Center which displayed the basic symbols used for genograms. Genograms were later developed and popularized by McGoldrick and Randy Gerson through their 1985 book titled Genograms in Family Assessment, as well as the fourth edition of Genograms: Assessment and Treatment, published in 2020 by McGoldrick, Gerson, and Sueli Petry.

Since then, genograms have now been used by various groups of people in a diversity of fields; many practitioners in healthcare and mental health have come to use genograms, specifically for services that are interested in contextually understanding human behavior patterns. individuals and groups in different fields have worked together to develop a standardized genogram. In psychiatry, Bowen and Bradt, as well as Philip Guerin, Brian Stagoll, and Karl Tomm have been credited. In psychology, Gerson and Petry, as well as Michael Rohrbaugh and Eliana Gil have been credited. In social work, Carter and McGoldrick, as well as Ann Hartman and Elaine Pinderhughes have been credited. In family medicine, Jack Medalie, Jack Froom, John Rodgers, and Michael Crouch have been credited.

== Applications ==
Genograms are used across multiple disciplines to assess family dynamics, health patterns, and relational structures.

=== Family therapy ===
In family therapy and marriage and family therapy (MFT), genograms serve as a core assessment tool. Therapists use them to identify multigenerational patterns of behavior, emotional functioning, and relationship dynamics. They help clinicians and families visualize patterns such as triangulation, emotional cutoff, and the multigenerational transmission of anxiety, as described in Bowen's family systems theory.

=== Medicine and nursing ===
In primary care and family medicine, genograms are used to collect family medical histories and identify hereditary risk factors. Studies have shown that genograms can capture more complete family health information than standard questionnaires. In genetic counseling, genograms (often called pedigree charts in that context) help assess hereditary cancer risk and other genetic conditions. The World Health Organization has also recognised the genogram as a tool for understanding family health in diverse cultural contexts.

=== Social work ===
Social workers use genograms alongside eco-maps for comprehensive family assessment in case management, child welfare, and community practice. Hartman (1995) advocated for the systematic use of diagrammatic tools including genograms in social work assessment to understand family relationships and resources.

=== Education and training ===
Genograms are widely used in clinical training programs for therapists, counselors, social workers, and medical residents. Students construct their own family genograms as a self-of-the-therapist exercise to develop self-awareness about how their family-of-origin patterns might affect their clinical work.'

== Symbols ==
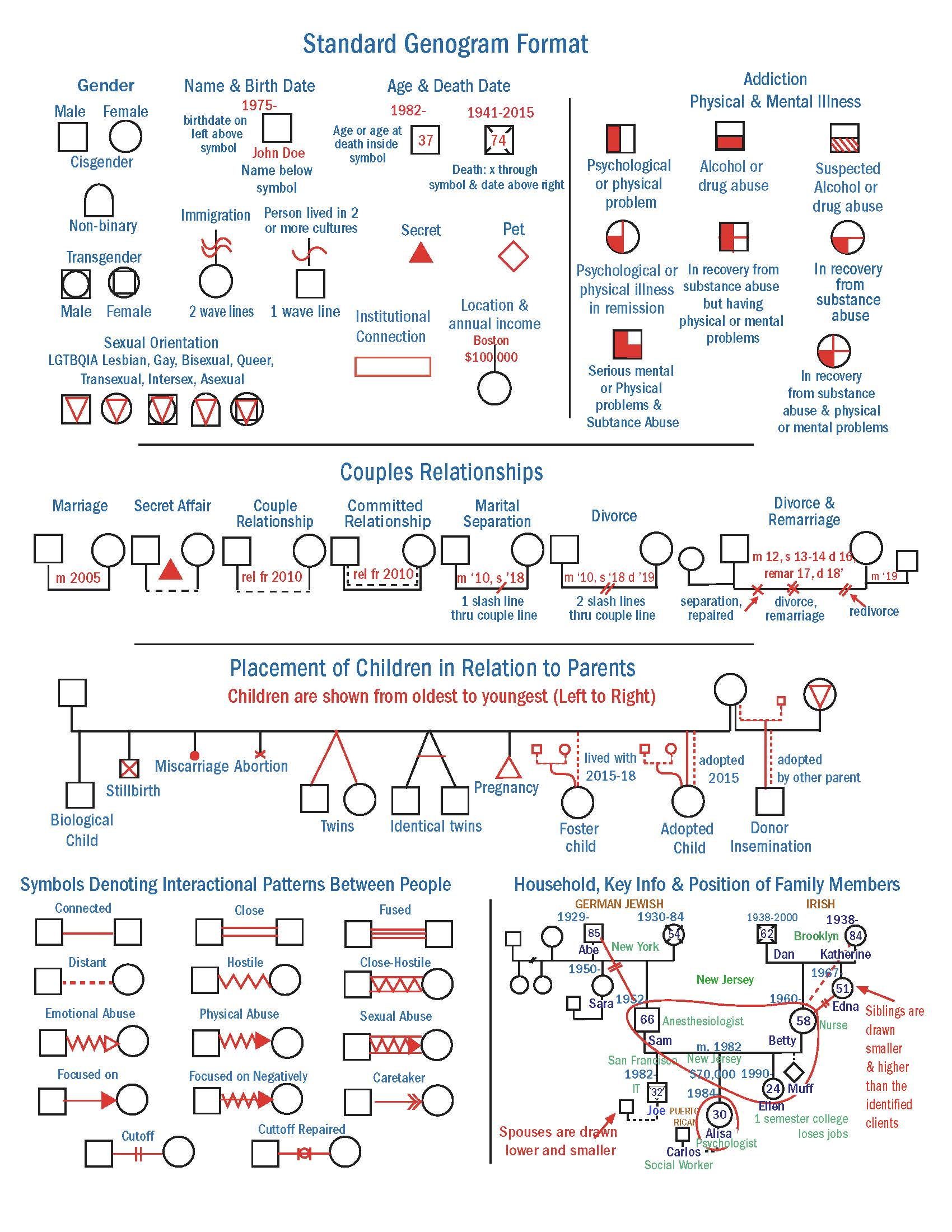
Basic genogram symbols

A genogram is created with simple symbols representing gender and various lines to illustrate family relationships. Genogram symbols typically include date of birth and date of death over three or more generations, with the name of the individual underneath each one; current age and/or age at death are indicated within the symbol for each person.

A genogram can contain a wealth of information on the families represented. It shows not merely the individuals within a family lineage but also detailed information about them and between them. For example, in a genogram involving a father named Paul and a wife named Lily with three children, the diagram can depict relationships such as their eldest child going to boarding school, their middle child having conflict with her mother, and their youngest having a health condition like juvenile diabetes. It can also show descriptions like Paul's mental health records or Lily's employment history.

== Software ==
Several software applications have been developed specifically for creating digital genograms. Early genogram software such as GenoPro (1998) provided desktop-based tools for constructing genograms with standardized symbols. General-purpose diagramming platforms also offer genogram templates, though with more limited clinical symbol libraries compared to dedicated genogram software.

== See also ==
- Ahnentafel
- Cousin chart (table of consanguinity)
- Eco-map
- Consanguinity#Genetic definitions (for general genetic similarity)
- Genealogical numbering systems
- Pedigree chart
