= Genealogical numbering systems =

Data visualization for family trees

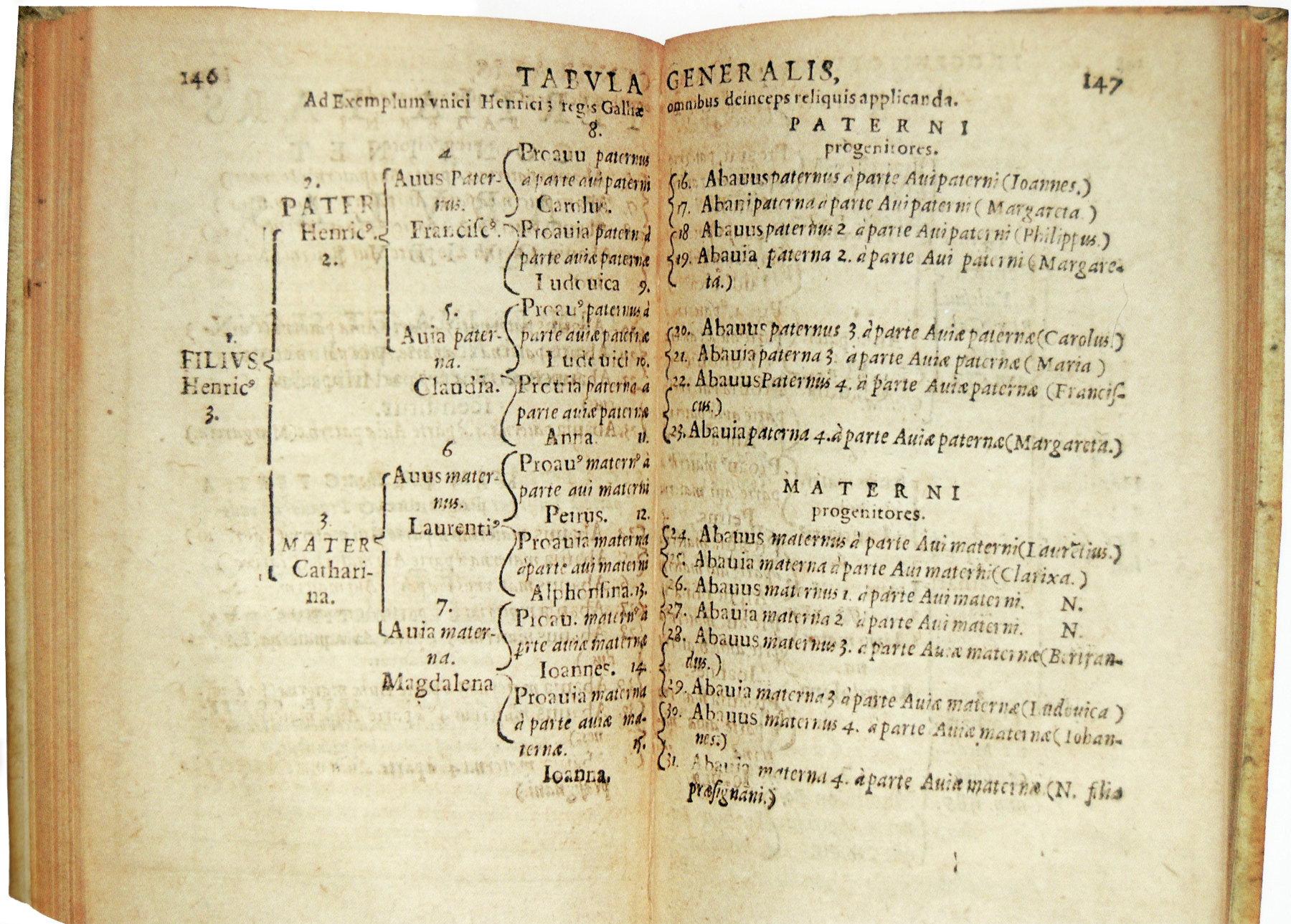
The first Ahnentafel, published by Michaël Eytzinger in Thesaurus principum hac aetate in Europa viventium Cologne: 1590, pp. 146-147, in which Eytzinger first illustrates his new functional theory of numeration of ancestors; this schema showing Henry III of France as n° 1, de cujus, with his ancestors in five generations.

Several genealogical numbering systems have been widely adopted for presenting family trees and pedigree charts in text format.

== Ascending numbering systems ==
=== Ahnentafel ===
Ahnentafel, also known as the Eytzinger Method, Sosa Method, and Sosa-Stradonitz Method, allows for the numbering of ancestors beginning with a descendant. This system allows one to derive an ancestor's number without compiling the complete list, and allows one to derive an ancestor's relationship based on their number. The number of a person's father is twice their own number, and the number of a person's mother is twice their own, plus one. For instance, if John Smith is 10, his father is 20, and his mother is 21, and his daughter is 5.

In order to readily have the generation stated for a certain person, the Ahnentafel numbering may be preceded by the generation. This method's usefulness becomes apparent when applied further back in the generations: e.g. 08-146, is a male preceding the subject by 7 (8-1) generations. This ancestor was the father of a woman (146/2=73) (in the genealogical line of the subject), who was the mother of a man (73/2=36.5), further down the line the father of a man (36/2=18), father of a woman (18/2=9), mother of a man (9/2=4.5), father of the subject's father (4/2=2). Hence, 08-146 is the subject's father's father's mother's father's father's mother's father.

The tree or Binary Ahnentafel method is based on the same numbering of nodes, but first converts the numbers to binary notation and then converts each 0 to M (for Male) and each 1 to F (for Female). The first character of each code (shown as X in the table below) is M if the subject is male and F if the subject is female. For example 5 becomes 101 and then FMF (or MMF if the subject is male). An advantage of this system is easier understanding of the genealogical path.

The first 15 codes in each system, identifying individuals in four generations, are as follows:

Relationship	Without	With	Binary (atree)
Relationship	Generation		Binary (atree)
First Generation
Subject	1	1–1 or 01–001	X
Second Generation
Father	2	2–2 or 02-002	XM
Mother	3	2–3 or 02-003	XF
Third Generation
Father's father	4	3–4 or 03-004	XMM
Father's mother	5	3–5 or 03-005	XMF
Mother's father	6	3–6 or 03-006	XFM
Mother's mother	7	3–7 or 03-007	XFF
Fourth Generation
Father's father's father	8	4–8 or 04-008	XMMM
Father's father's mother	9	4–9 or 04-009	XMMF
Father's mother's father	10	4–10 or 04-010	XMFM
Father's mother's mother	11	4–11 or 04-011	XMFF
Mother's father's father	12	4–12 or 04-012	XFMM
Mother's father's mother	13	4–13 or 04-013	XFMF
Mother's mother's father	14	4–14 or 04-014	XFFM
Mother's mother's mother	15	4–15 or 04-015	XFFF

=== Surname methods ===
Genealogical writers sometimes choose to present ancestral lines by carrying back individuals with their spouses or single families generation by generation. The siblings of the individual or individuals studied may or may not be named for each family. This method is most popular in simplified single surname studies, however, allied surnames of major family branches may be carried back as well. In general, numbers are assigned only to the primary individual studied in each generation.

== Descending numbering systems ==
=== Register System ===
The Register System uses both common numerals (1, 2, 3, 4) and Roman numerals (i, ii, iii, iv). The system is organized by generation, i.e., generations are grouped separately.

The system was created in 1870 for use in the New England Historical and Genealogical Register published by the New England Historic Genealogical Society based in Boston, Massachusetts. Register Style, of which the numbering system is part, is one of two major styles used in the U.S. for compiling descending genealogies. (The other being the NGSQ System.)

      (–Generation One–) 
1 Progenitor
     2     i  Child
          ii  Child (no progeny)
         iii  Child (no progeny)
     3    iv  Child

      (–Generation Two–)
2 Child
           i  Grandchild (no progeny)
          ii  Grandchild (no progeny)
3 Child
     4     i  Grandchild

      (–Generation Three–)
4 Grandchild
     5     i  Great-grandchild
          ii  Great-grandchild (no progeny)
     6   iii  Great-grandchild
     7    iv  Great-grandchild

=== NGSQ System ===
The NGSQ System gets its name from the National Genealogical Society Quarterly published by the National Genealogical Society headquartered in Falls Church, Virginia, which uses the method in its articles. It is sometimes called the "Record System" or the "Modified Register System" because it derives from the Register System. The most significant difference between the NGSQ and the Register Systems is in the method of numbering for children who are not carried forward into future generations: The NGSQ System assigns a number to every child, whether or not that child is known to have progeny, and the Register System does not. Other differences between the two systems are mostly stylistic.

      (–Generation One–) 
1 Progenitor
  +  2     i  Child
     3    ii  Child (no progeny)
     4   iii  Child (no progeny)
  +  5    iv  Child

      (–Generation Two–)
2 Child
     6     i  Grandchild (no progeny)
     7    ii  Grandchild (no progeny)
5 Child
  +  8     i  Grandchild

      (–Generation Three–)
8 Grandchild
  +  9     i  Great-grandchild
    10    ii  Great-grandchild (no progeny)
  + 11   iii  Great-grandchild
  + 12    iv  Great-grandchild

=== Henry System ===
The Henry System is a descending system created by Reginald Buchanan Henry for a genealogy of the families of the presidents of the United States that he wrote in 1935. It can be organized either by generation or not. The system begins with 1. The oldest child becomes 11, the next child is 12, and so on. The oldest child of 11 is 111, the next 112, and so on. The system allows one to derive an ancestor's relationship based on their number. For example, 621 is the first child of 62, who is the second child of 6, who is the sixth child of his parents.

In the Henry System, when there are more than nine children, X is used for the 10th child, A is used for the 11th child, B is used for the 12th child, and so on. In the Modified Henry System, when there are more than nine children, numbers greater than nine are placed in parentheses.

Henry		                   Modified Henry
1. Progenitor 		               1. Progenitor 
   11. Child		                  11. Child
       111. Grandchild		              111. Grandchild
            1111. Great-grandchild                1111. Great-grandchild
            1112. Great-grandchild                1112. Great-grandchild
       112. Grandchild		              112. Grandchild
   12. Child		                  12. Child
       121. Grandchild		              121. Grandchild
            1211. Great-grandchild                1211. Great-grandchild
            1212. Great-grandchild                1212. Great-grandchild
       122. Grandchild		              122. Grandchild
            1221. Great-grandchild                1221. Great-grandchild
       123. Grandchild		              123. Grandchild
       124. Grandchild		              124. Grandchild
       125. Grandchild		              125. Grandchild
       126. Grandchild		              126. Grandchild
       127. Grandchild		              127. Grandchild
       128. Grandchild		              128. Grandchild
       129. Grandchild		              129. Grandchild
       12X. Grandchild		              12(10). Grandchild

=== d'Aboville System ===
The d'Aboville System is a descending numbering method developed by Jacques d'Aboville in 1940 that is very similar to the Henry System, widely used in France. It can be organized either by generation or not. It differs from the Henry System in that periods are used to separate the generations and no changes in numbering are needed for families with more than nine children. For example:

1 Progenitor
  1.1 Child
      1.1.1 Grandchild
            1.1.1.1 Great-grandchild
            1.1.1.2 Great-grandchild
      1.1.2 Grandchild
  1.2 Child
      1.2.1 Grandchild
            1.2.1.1 Great-grandchild
            1.2.1.2 Great-grandchild
      1.2.2 Grandchild
            1.2.2.1 Great-grandchild
      1.2.3 Grandchild
      1.2.4 Grandchild
      1.2.5 Grandchild
      1.2.6 Grandchild
      1.2.7 Grandchild
      1.2.8 Grandchild
      1.2.9 Grandchild
      1.2.10 Grandchild

=== Meurgey de Tupigny System ===
The Meurgey de Tupigny System is a simple numbering method used for single surname studies and hereditary nobility line studies developed by Jacques Meurgey de Tupigny of the National Archives of France, published in 1953.

Each generation is identified by a Roman numeral (I, II, III, ...), and each child and cousin in the same generation carrying the same surname is identified by an Arabic numeral. The numbering system usually appears on or in conjunction with a pedigree chart. Example:

I Progenitor
  II-1 Child
       III-1 Grandchild
             IV-1  Great-grandchild
             IV-2  Great-grandchild 
       III-2 Grandchild
       III-3 Grandchild
       III-4 Grandchild
  II-2 Child
       III-5 Grandchild
             IV-3  Great-grandchild
             IV-4  Great-grandchild 
             IV-5  Great-grandchild
       III-6 Grandchild

=== de Villiers/Pama System ===
The de Villiers/Pama System gives letters to generations, and then numbers children in birth order. For example:

a Progenitor
  b1 Child
     c1 Grandchild
        d1 Great-grandchild
        d2 Great-grandchild
     c2 Grandchild
     c3 Grandchild
  b2 Child
     c1 Grandchild
        d1 Great-grandchild
        d2 Great-grandchild
        d3 Great-grandchild
     c2 Grandchild
     c3 Grandchild

In this system, b2.c3 is the third child of the second child, and is one of the progenitor's grandchildren.

The de Villiers/Pama system is the standard for genealogical works in South Africa. It was developed in the 19th century by Christoffel Coetzee de Villiers and used in his three volume Geslachtregister der Oude Kaapsche Familien (Genealogies of Old Cape Families). The system was refined by Dr. Cornelis (Cor) Pama, one of the founding members of the Genealogical Society of South Africa.

== A literal system ==
Bibby (2012) proposed a literal system to trace relationships between members of the same family. This used the following: f = father m = mother so = son d = daughter b = brother si = sister h = husband w = wife c = cousin. By concatenating these symbols, more distant relationships can be summarised, e.g.: ff = father’s father fm = father’s mother mf = mother’s father.

We interpret “brother” and “sister” to mean “same father, same mother” i.e: b = fso and mso si = fd and md. Some cases need careful parsing, e.g. fs means “father’s son”. This could represent (1) the person himself, or (2) a brother, or (3) a half-brother (same father, different mother). Very often, terms are synonymous. So m (mother) and fw (father’s wife) might refer to the same person. Generally m might be preferred – leaving fw to mean a father’s wife who is not the mother. Similarly, c (cousin) might mean fbso or fbd or fsiso or fsid, or indeed mbso or mbd or msiso or msid, or several other combinations especially if grandfather married several times. Brother-in-law etc. is similarly ambiguous. Other genealogical notations have been proposed, of course. This one is not claimed to be optimal, but it has been found convenient. In Bibby's usage, the “home” person is Karl Pearson, and all relationships are relative to him. So f is his father, and m is his mother, etc., while fw is Karl’s father’s second wife (who is not his mother).

== See also ==
- Ahnentafel
- Cousin chart (Table of consanguinity)
- Family tree
- Family tree mapping
- GEDCOM
- Genogram
- Kinship terminology
- Pedigree chart
- Pedigree collapse
- Numerical variation in kinship terms
