= Quarters of nobility =

Numerical measure of nobility based on aristocratic ancestry

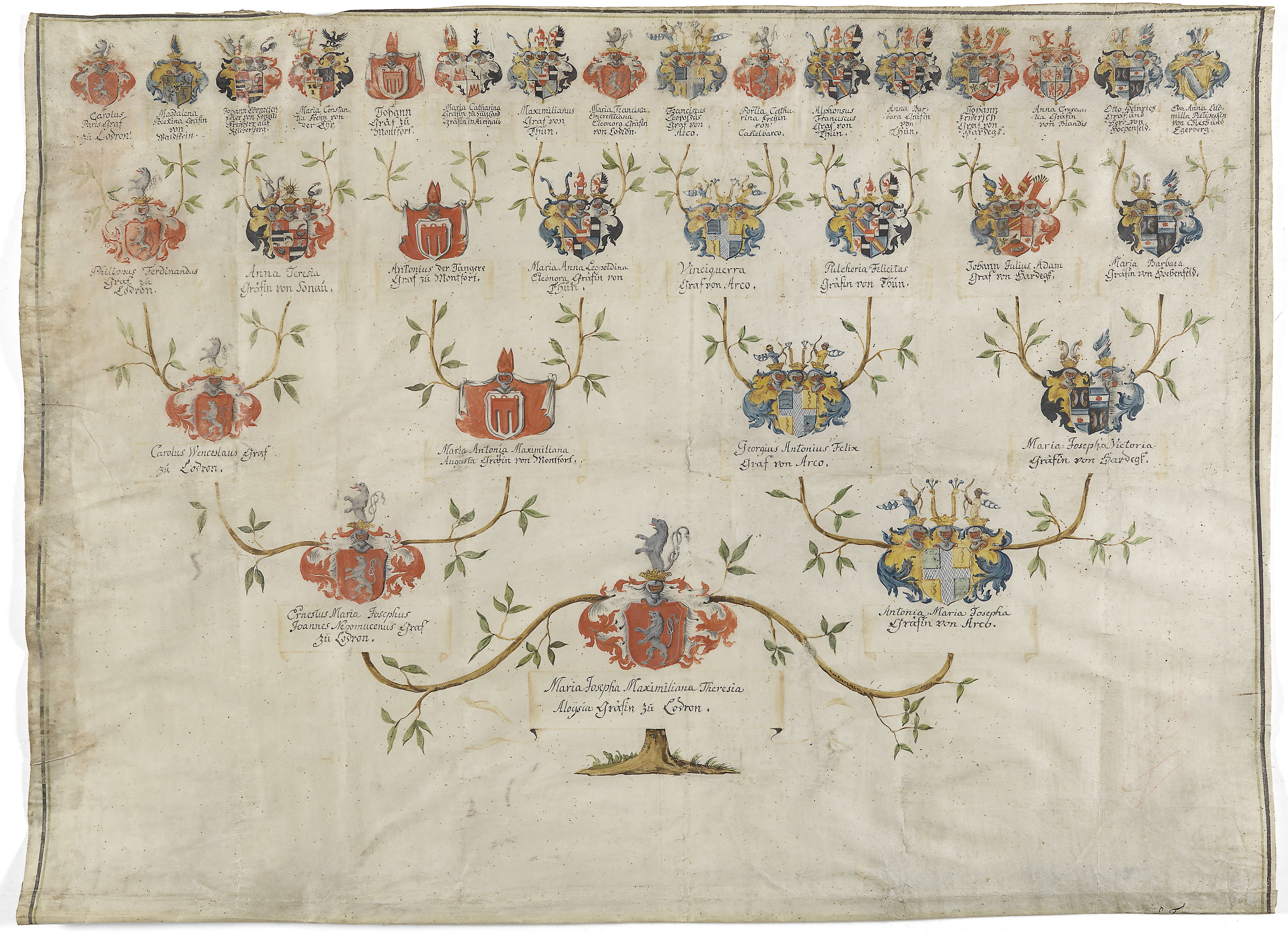
Seize quartiers on the ahnenreihe of Josepha Maximiliana Lodron (1786)

The power arrangements in the continental Europe prior to the 20th century gave preference to nobility. Some civil, ecclesiastical, and military positions had required the holder to be sufficiently noble, with quarters of nobility being a numerical measure of one's nobility. The quarters term is related to the quarterings in heraldry.

The number of noble quarters was associated with the number of nobles in previous generations of the family (ahnentafel), in which noble status has been kept regardless of whether a title was actually in use by each person in the ancestral line in question. For example, a person having sixteen quarterings (formally in heraldry "Seize Quartiers"), might have exclusively noble ancestry for the four previous generations (i.e., to the great-great-grandparent level): Given two parents per generation, four generations of uninterrupted nobility = 2^{4} = 16. Alternatively, such a person might have exclusively noble ancestry for the five previous generations on one side, but have a commoner for their other parent, such that the latter side of that person's ancestry would "dilute" by half the nobility they derived from the former side: (2^{5})/2 = 32/2 = 16.

If the family tree was perfect (all-noble) it was declared that the "House was Full", a defective quartering was called a window.

The number of noble quarters required for admission differed based on the country of origin, for example, to join the Knights of Malta at the turn of the 19th century, four quarters were sufficient for a Frenchman, eight were required from a German or Spanish postulant. This discrepancy was due to the fact that few French courtiers were able to provide a long uninterrupted noble lineage, due to frequent mesalliances with members of merchants' or financiers' families. A canon position at the Strasburg Cathedral required sixteen quarters.

In most cases, four quarters were enough, occasionally sixteen were required, the largest number ever required in France was 32, in Germany, 64.

Contemporary use of noble quarters is rare, although the Bailiwick of Utrecht until 2006 required a proof of four quarters from a knight candidate. This requirement had survived from ancient times (when the main branch of Teutonic order required 16 quarters), but in 2006 was lowered to one paternal and one maternal quarter, with paternal quarter lineage dating to at least 1795. The rule was established to keep out burghers and the new aristocracy (Catholics were ineligible due to another rule).

== Three descents of nobles ==
Use of the term "quarters" and the requirement of four quarters come from the belief that a "gentlemen of blood" needs to have at least three descents of nobles (grandparents, parent, himself) in his pedigree. This rule was attributed to the Ancient Roman requirement of equestrian cense: to join the equites, it was not enough for a man to be freeborn, but his father and grandfather should also be freeborns. The four "tesseras of gentility" were placed in the corners of the escutcheon (shield of the coat of arms) of the grandson, forming the "quarters". The resulting Latin: Quarteria Tessera, vel argumenta nobilitatis was to be placed prominently on monuments as a proof of nobility.

== Seize quartiers ==
Seize quartiers is a French phrase which literally means a person's "sixteen quarters", the coats of arms of their sixteen great-great-grandparents quarters of nobility, which are typically accompanied by a five generation genealogy ahnentafel outlining the relationship between them and their descendant. They were used as a proof of nobility ("the proof of the Seize Quartiers") in part of Continental Europe beginning in the seventeenth century and achieving their highest prominence in the eighteenth. In other parts, like in France, antiquity of the male line was preferred. Possession of seize-quartiers guaranteed admission to any court in Europe, and bestowed many advantages. For example, Frederick the Great was known to make a study of the seize quartiers of his courtiers.

The long proven noble lineages were less common in the British Isles, seventeenth-century Scottish examples being the most prevalent. According to Arthur Charles Fox-Davies in 1909, there were very few valid examples of seize quartiers among British families outside a small group of "Roman Catholic aristocracy", and after diligent searching, he could only find two Britons who were entitled to Trente Deux Quartiers (32 quarters, or previous generations of ancestors who were all armigerous). Nevertheless, in 1953, Iain Moncreiffe and Don Pottinger were able to prove that the 8th Duke of Buccleuch (and his sister, the Princess Alice) were certainly seize quartiers, as all their great-great-grandparents had coats of arms, but not all were titled.

Some held the view that, once a family had achieved seize-quartiers, descendants in the male line would continue to be entitled to the benefits even if they continually married non-armigerous women. Their use is now generally limited to genealogical, heraldic, and antiquarian circles.

== Proving nobility ==
A proof of nobility was widespread in Europe since the early modern period. The governments started to take control of the previously ad-hoc process in the early 17th century, possibly using the practices utilized by the Order of Malta as a template. The standardization originated in the Holy Roman Empire and then spread to its neighbors (the Low Countries, Lorraine, Alsace, Franche-Comté), encouraging the portability of proofs between chapters of military orders. The successful implementation led to further adoptions, including the one in France.

The procedures of establishing the proof of nobility got quite elaborate during the 18th century, with candidates required to provide an extensive set of documents in order to claim their 8, 16 or 32 noble ancestors. The documents had to both prove the nobility of the ancestor and show the descent of the candidate from these nobles. The acceptable documents included the certificates of baptism and marriage, wills, proof of past membership in noble institutions, like provincial estates and chivalric circles), records of participation in knight tournaments, inscriptions on tombstones, stained-glass windows in churches with coats of arms. The file was then submitted for "nobility proceedings" by the commissioners of a specialized institution who filled the ancestor's tree using the submitted documents and archival records of previous validations.

== See also ==
- Patent of nobility

== Sources ==
- de Bruin, Renger E. (2018-12-30). "The religious identity of the Teutonic Order Bailiwick of Utrecht, 1560–2006". Ordines Militares Colloquia Torunensia Historica. 23: 235. doi:10.12775/OM.2018.009. ISSN 2391-7512.
- Butler, C. (1807). A Connected Series of Notes on the Chief Revolutions of the Principal States which Composed the Empire of Charlemagne, from His Coronation in 814 to Its Dissolution in 1806; on the Genealogies of the Imperial House of Habsburgh, and of the Six Secular Electors of Germany; and on Roman, German, French, and English Nobility.
- Dronkers, Jaap (2003). "Has the Dutch Nobility Retained Its Social Relevance during the 20th Century?". European Sociological Review. 19 (1). Oxford University Press: 81–96. doi:10.1093/esr/19.1.81. ISSN 0266-7215. JSTOR 3559476.
- Fox-Davies, Arthur Charles (1909). A Complete Guide to Heraldry: Illustrated by Nine Plates in Colour and Nearly 800 Other Designs, Mainly From Drawings by Graham Johnston, Herald Painter to the Lyon Court (a shorter version of The Art of Heraldry: An Encyclopædia of Armory). Edinburgh: T.C. & E.C. Jack. pp. 619–620. LCCN 73-115793 (1969 re-print), LCCN 84-29280 (1985 re-print); OCLC 1048481784
- Hassler, Éric (2024). "The introduction of proofs of noble birth into the Habsburg monarchy. A new instrument to administrate the nobility (1650-1800)". Cornova. 14 (2): 11–45. doi:10.51305/cor.2024.02.01. ISSN 1804-6983.
- La Roque, Gilles-André de [in French] (1678). Traité de la noblesse, de ses différentes espèces [Treatise on Nobility and Its Different Types] (in French). Paris: Etienne Michalet. pp. 5, 8–10.
- Nisbet, A. (1804). A System of Heraldry, Speculative and Practical: with the True Art of Blazon ... Illustrated with Suitable Examples of Armorial Figures, and Achievements of the Most Considerable Surnames and Families in Scotland ... A. Lawrie & Company.
