= Proband =

Medical subject being studied and reported on

In medical genetics and other medical fields, a proband, propositus (male), or proposita (female) is a particular subject (human or other animal) being studied or reported on. On pedigrees, the proband is noted with a triangle (male) or circle (female) shaded accordingly. Denoting the proband is important, so the relationship to other individuals can be seen and patterns established.

In most cases, the proband is the first affected family member who seeks medical attention for a genetic disorder. Among the ancestors of the proband, other subjects may manifest the disease, but the proband typically refers to the member seeking medical attention or being studied, even if affected ancestors are known. Often, affected ancestors are unknown due to the lack of information regarding those individuals or about the disease at the time they lived. Other ancestors might be undiagnosed due to the incomplete penetrance or variable expressivity.

The diagnosis of a proband raises the index of suspicion for the proband's relatives and some of them may be diagnosed with the same disease. Conventionally, when drawing a pedigree chart, instead of the first diagnosed person, the proband may be chosen from among the affected ancestors (parents, grandparents) from the first generation where the disease is found.

== Other uses ==
The term "proband" is also used in genealogy, where it denotes the root node of an ahnentafel, also referred to as the progenitor.

"Proband" was also the term for the individual being tested in a trial by ordeal
