= Sigmund Christoph von Waldburg-Zeil-Trauchburg =

German Roman Catholic bishop

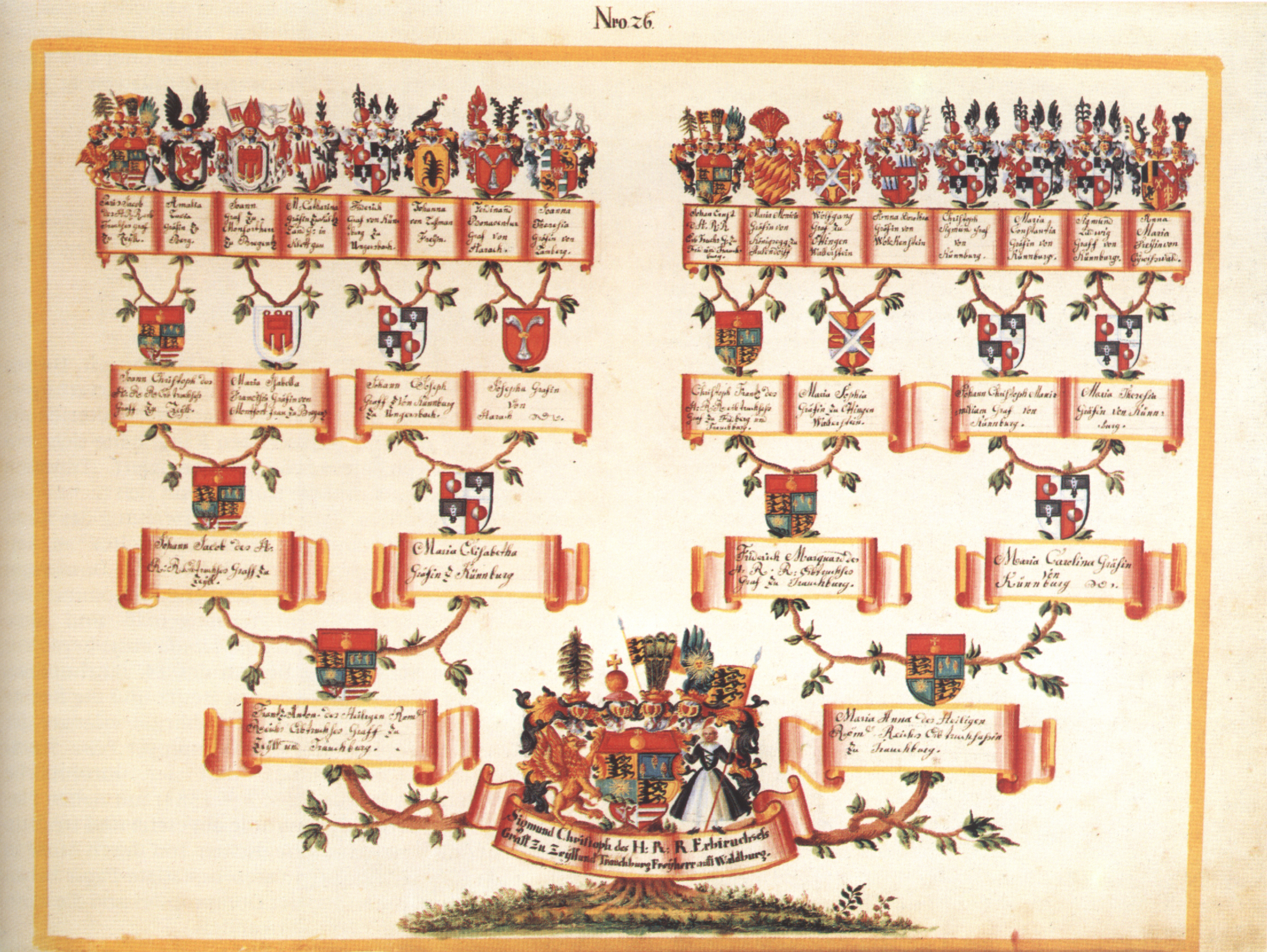
Ahnentafel (ancestry tree) of Sigmund Christoph von Waldburg-Zeil-Trauchburg

Sigmund Christoph von Waldburg-Zeil-Trauchburg (Munich, 28 August 1754 - Salzburg, 7 November 1814) was a German Roman Catholic bishop. He was the last bishop of Chiemsee and apostolic administrator of Salzburg.

== See also ==
- Waldburg family
