= Haseman–Elston regression =

Genetic linkage regression technique

In statistical genetics, Haseman–Elston (HE) regression is a statistical regression originally proposed for linkage analysis of quantitative traits in sibling pairs. It was first developed by Joseph K. Haseman and Robert C. Elston in 1972. A much earlier implementation of sib-pair linkage analysis was proposed by Lionel S. Penrose in 1935 and 1938. Notably, Penrose was the father of Nobel laureate theoretical physicist Roger Penrose.

In 2000, Elston et al. introduced a "revisited" and extended form of Haseman–Elston regression. Since then, further extensions of this revised model have been proposed. Despite its historical significance, HE regression has been described as "...a rusty weapon in the genomics analysis armory of the GWAS era." This criticism arises because HE regression relies on relatedness measured by identity by descent (IBD), rather than identity by state (IBS). However, adaptations of HE regression have been developed for association analysis in unrelated samples, where relatedness is measured by IBS.
