= Reginald Buchanan Henry =

American medical doctor (1881–1969)

Reginald Buchanan Henry (23 May 1881 – 18 Feb 1969) was a medical doctor, Captain in the United States Navy and genealogist.

== Life ==
Henry was born on 23 May 1881 in the Long Island City section of Queens, New York. He was the fifth of six sons of James Buchanan Henry, Sr. and his second wife Louisa Anderson. Henry served in the Navy as a Captain in the Medical Corps.

Henry is best known for his book Genealogies of the Families of the Presidents. In this book, he created a numbering system assigning a number to the individual indicating that person's position in the family tree. Because his book is the earliest book published which used this system, it has come to be known as the Henry system.

Henry died 18 Feb 1969 in Norfolk, Virginia.
