= Family tree =

Chart representing family relationships

Example of a family tree. Reading left to right Lucas Grey is the father of three children, the grandfather of five grandchildren and the great-grandfather of three siblings Joseph, John and Laura Wetter.

Family tree showing the relationship of each person to the orange person, including cousins and gene share

A family tree, also called a genealogical tree or a pedigree chart, is a chart representing family relationships in a conventional tree structure. More detailed family trees, used in medicine and social work, are known as genograms.

== Representations of family history ==
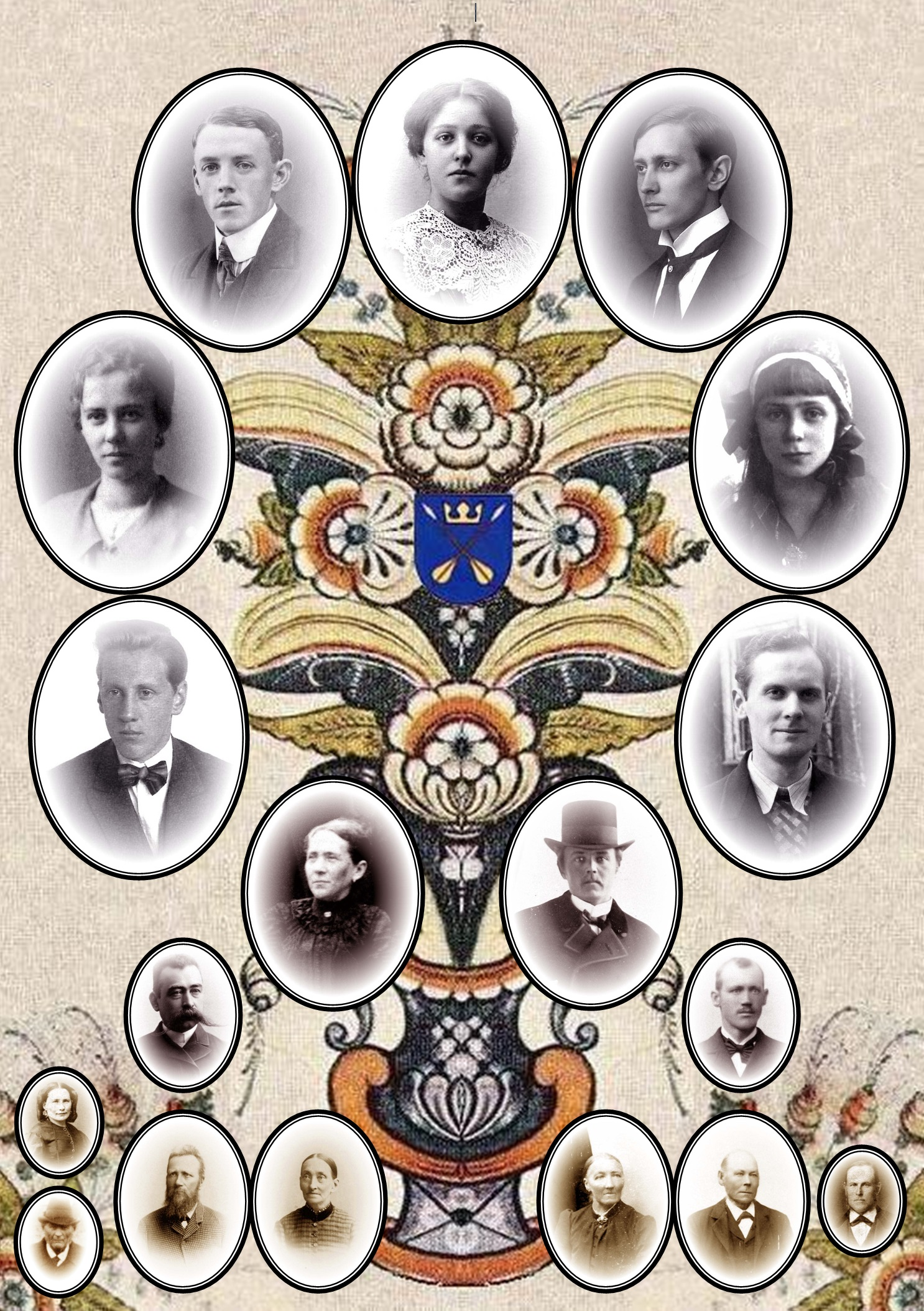
Three generations of ancestors (born from 1824 to 1916) placed on a Swedish kurbits tree

Genealogical data can be represented in several formats, for example, as an ancestral tree, or stemma (from Greek στέμμα / wreath), pedigree or ancestry chart. Family trees are often presented with the oldest generations at the top of the tree and the younger generations at the bottom. An ancestry chart, which is a tree showing the ancestors of an individual and not all members of a family, will more closely resemble a tree in shape, being wider at the top than at the bottom. In some ancestry charts, an individual appears on the left and their ancestors appear to the right. Conversely, a descendant chart, which depicts all the descendants of an individual, will be narrowest at the top. Beyond these formats, some family trees might include all members of a particular surname (e.g., male-line descendants). Yet another approach is to include all holders of a certain office, such as the Kings of Germany, which represents the reliance on marriage to link dynasties together.

The passage of time can also be included to illustrate ancestry and descent. A time scale is often used, expanding radially across the center, divided into decades. Children of the parent form branches around the center and their names are plotted in their birth year on the time scale. Spouses' names join children's names and nuclear families of parents and children branch off to grandchildren, and so on. Great-grandparents are often in the center to portray four or five generations, which reflect the natural growth pattern of a tree as seen from the top but sometimes there can be great-great-grandparents or more. In a descendant tree, living relatives are common on the outer branches and contemporary cousins appear adjacent to each other. Privacy should be considered when preparing a living family tree.

The image of the tree probably originated with that of the Tree of Jesse in medieval art, used to illustrate the Genealogy of Christ in terms of a prophecy of Isaiah (Isaiah 11:1). Possibly the first non-biblical use, and the first to show full family relationships rather than a purely patrilineal scheme, was that involving family trees of the classical gods in Boccaccio's Genealogia Deorum Gentilium ("On the Genealogy of the Gods of the Gentiles"), whose first version dates to 1360.

== Common formats ==
In addition to familiar representations of family history and genealogy as a tree structure, there are other notable systems used to illustrate and document ancestry and descent.

=== Ahnentafel ===
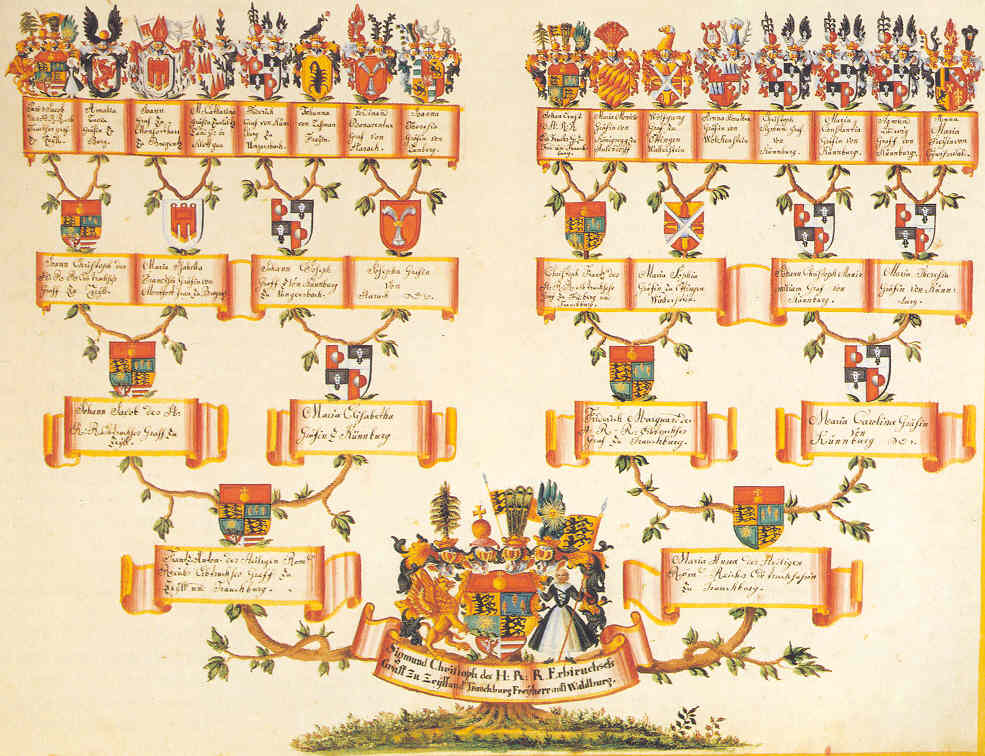
An ahnentafel family tree displaying an ancestor chart of Sigmund Christoph, Graf von Zeil und Trauchburg

An Ahnentafel (German for "ancestor table") is a genealogical numbering system for listing a person's direct ancestors in a fixed sequence of ascent:

1. Subject (or proband)
2. Father
3. Mother
4. Paternal grandfather
5. Paternal grandmother
6. Maternal grandfather
7. Maternal grandmother

and so on, back through the generations. Apart from the subject or proband, who can be male or female, all even-numbered persons are male, and all odd-numbered persons are female. In this scheme, the number of any person's father is double the person's number, and a person's mother is double the person's number plus one. This system can also be displayed as a tree:

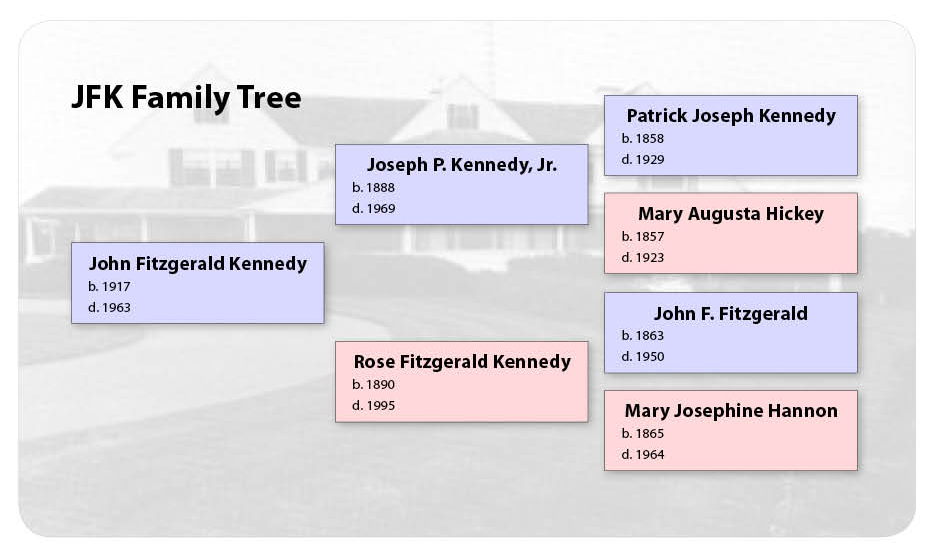
An ahnentafel family tree, showing three generations of the Kennedy family

4. Paternal grandfather
2. Father
5. Paternal grandmother
1 Subject (or proband)
6. Maternal grandfather
3. Mother
7. Maternal grandmother

=== Fan chart ===
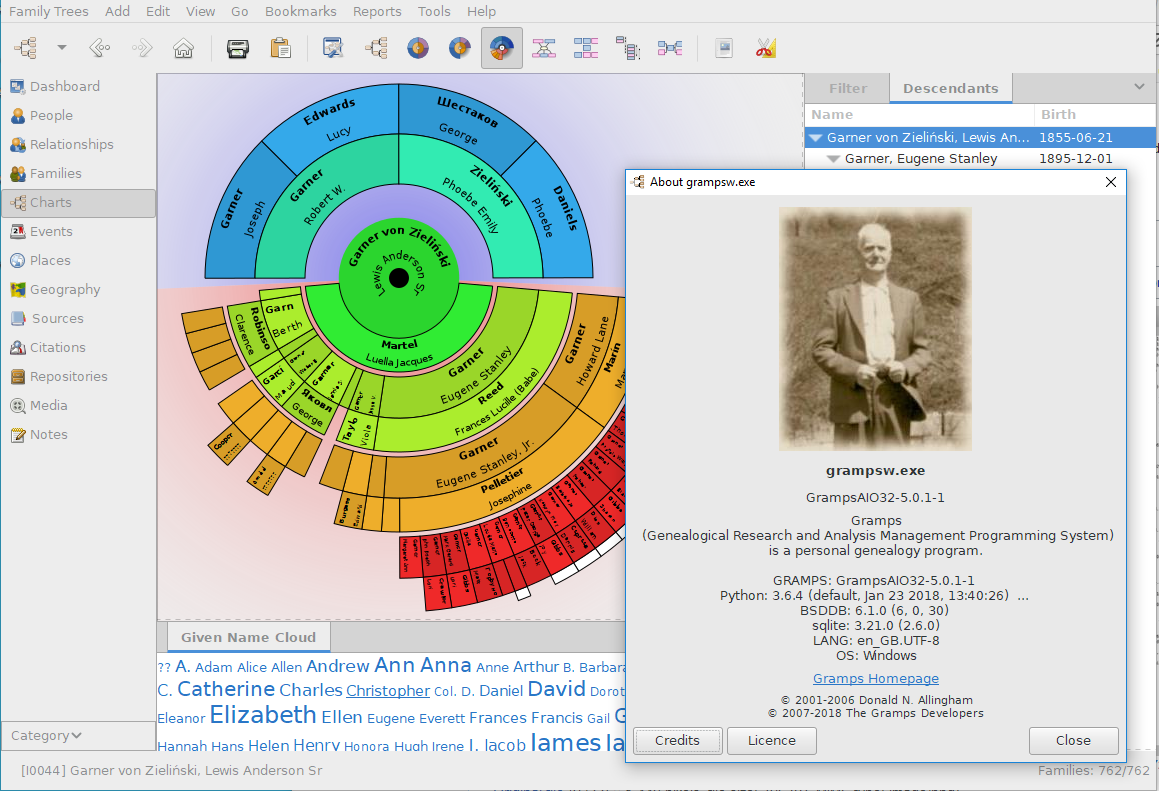
Screenshot of Gramps (v. 5.0.1) displaying a fan chart and the given name cloud gramplet on the bottom

A fan chart features a half circle chart with concentric rings: the subject is the inner circle, the second circle is divided in two (each side is one parent), the third circle is divided in four, and so forth. Fan charts depict paternal and maternal ancestors.

== Graph theory ==
While family trees are depicted as trees, family relations do not in general form a tree in the strict sense used in graph theory, since distant relatives can mate. Therefore, a person can have a common ancestor on both their mother's and father's side. However, because a parent must be born before their child, an individual cannot be their own ancestor, and thus there are no loops. In this regard, ancestry forms a directed acyclic graph. Nevertheless, graphs depicting matrilineal descent (mother-daughter relationships) and patrilineal descent (father-son relationships) do form trees. Assuming no common ancestor, an ancestry chart is a perfect binary tree, as each person has exactly one mother and one father; these thus have a regular structure. A descendant chart, on the other hand, does not, in general, have a regular structure, as a person can have any number of children or none at all.

== Notable examples ==
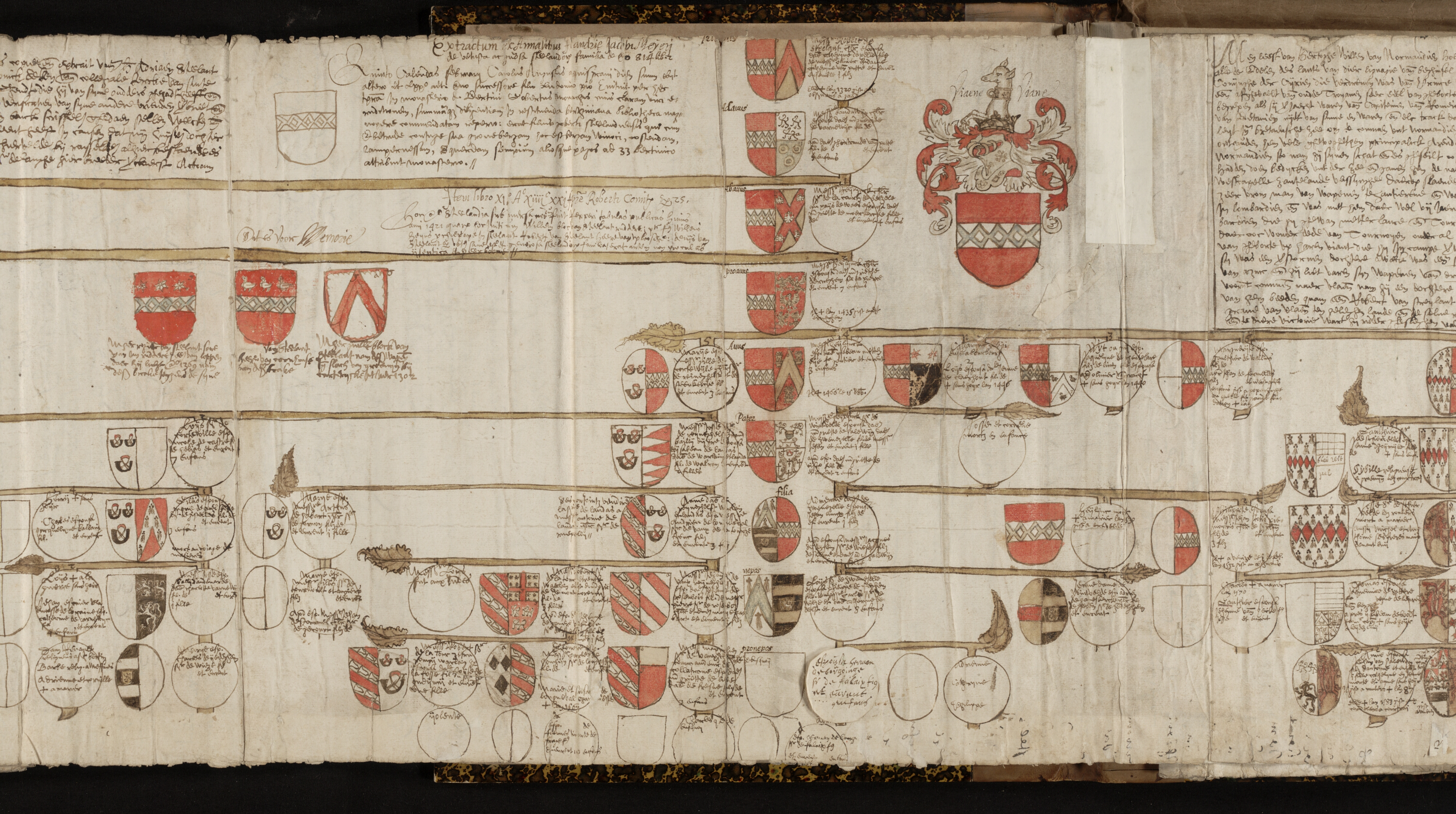
Family trees are an age-old phenomenon. This example dates from the sixteenth century.

Family trees have been used to document family histories across time and cultures throughout the world.

=== Africa ===
In Africa, the ruling dynasty of Ethiopia claimed descent from King Solomon via the Queen of Sheba. Through this claim, the family traced their descent back to the House of David.

The genealogy of Ancient Egyptian ruling dynasties was recorded from the beginnings of the Pharaonic era c. 3000 BC to the end of the Ptolemaic Kingdom; although this is not a record of one continuously linked family lineage, and surviving records are incomplete.

Elsewhere in Africa, oral traditions of genealogical recording predominate. Members of the Keita dynasty of Mali, for example, have had their pedigrees sung by griots during annual ceremonies since the 14th century. Meanwhile, in Nigeria, many ruling clans—most notably those descended from Oduduwa—claim descent from the legendary King Kisra. Here too, pedigrees are recited by griots attached to the royal courts. Amongs the Serer ethnoreligous group and nation found today in present-day Senegal, The Gambia, Mauritania, and Guinea-Bissau, they have preserved the epic and genealogies of their royal and noble families for centuries, including the 11th century prince Lamane Jegan Joof, the 13th century King of La, maad Ndaah Njemeh Joof, his descendants, the Joof dynasty and their relatives the Faye dynasty.

=== The Americas ===
In some pre-contact Native American civilizations, genealogical records of ruling and priestly families were kept, some of which extended over several centuries or longer.

=== East Asia ===
There are extensive genealogies for the ruling dynasties of China, but these do not form a single, unified family tree. Additionally, it is unclear at which point(s) the most ancient historical figures named become mythological.

In Japan, the ancestry of the Imperial Family is traced back to the mythological origins of Japan. The connection to persons from the established historical record only begins in the mid-first millennium AD.

The longest family tree in the world is that of the Chinese philosopher and educator Confucius (551–479 BC), who is descended from King Tang (1675–1646 BC). The tree spans more than 80 generations from him and includes more than 2 million members. An international effort involving more than 450 branches around the world was started in 1998 to retrace and revise this family tree. A new edition of the Confucius genealogy was printed in September 2009 by the Confucius Genealogy Compilation Committee, to coincide with the 2560th anniversary of the birth of the Chinese thinker. This latest edition was expected to include some 1.3 million living members who are scattered around the world today.

=== Europe and West Asia ===
Before the Dark Ages, in the Greco-Roman world, some reliable pedigrees dated back perhaps at least as far as the first half of the first millennium BC; with claimed or mythological origins reaching back further. Roman clan and family lineages played an important part in the structure of their society and were the basis of their intricate system of personal names. However, there was a break in the continuity of record-keeping at the end of Classical Antiquity. Records of the lines of succession of the Popes and the Eastern Roman Emperors through this transitional period have survived, but these are not continuous genealogical histories of single families. Refer to descent from antiquity.

Many noble and aristocratic families of European and West Asian origin can reliably trace their ancestry back as far as the mid to late first millennium AD; some claiming undocumented descent from Classical Antiquity or mythological ancestors. In Europe, for example, the pedigree of Niall Noígíallach would be a contender for the longest, through Conn of the Hundred Battles (fl. 123 AD); in the legendary history of Ireland, he is further descended from Breogán, and ultimately from Adam, through the sons of Noah.

Another very old and extensive tree is that of the Lurie lineage—which includes Sigmund Freud and Martin Buber—and traces back to Lurie, a 13th-century rabbi in Brest-Litovsk, and from there to Rashi and purportedly back to the legendary King David, as documented by Neil Rosenstein in his book The Lurie Legacy. The 1999 edition of the Guinness Book of Records recorded the Lurie family in the "longest lineage" category as one of the oldest-known living families in the world today.

Family trees and representations of lineages are also important in religious traditions. The biblical genealogies of Jesus also claim descent from the House of David, covering a period of approximately 1000 years. In the Torah and Old Testament, genealogies are provided for many biblical persons, including a record of the descendants of Adam. Also according to the Torah, the Kohanim are descended from Aaron. Genetic testing performed at the Technion has shown that most modern Kohanim share common Y-chromosome origins, although there is no complete family tree of the Kohanim. In the Islamic world, claimed descent from Muhammad greatly enhanced the status of political and religious leaders; new dynasties often used claims of such descent to help establish their legitimacy.

==== Pre-Islamic Arabia ====
In pre-Islamic Arabia, the Arab tribes were often organized around extended family units, and tribal identity was key to understanding one's heritage and honor. Each tribe, or qabila, would trace its lineage back to a common ancestor. These genealogies were passed down orally, with poets, historians, and storytellers responsible for preserving these family histories. The Arabs were well known for their oral traditions and poetry, where family lineages were often preserved in elaborate genealogies. For example, many pre-Islamic poets like Imru' al-Qais referenced their tribal heritage and the great ancestors of their families in their poetry.

==== Islamic era and beyond ====
With the rise of Islam in the 7th century, genealogy took on even more significance, particularly for those having descent from the Islamic prophet Muhammad. Sayyids (those who trace their lineage back to Muhammad) and Hashemites (the family of the Muhammad's clan) have been highly regarded throughout history. Muhammad's family tree is one of the most well-known genealogical records in the Arab world. The Islamic era also formalized the recording of genealogies, with Islamic scholars beginning to document and preserve family histories in written form. This was not only important for religious reasons but also for maintaining tribal alliances, political power, and historical records. The first known recorded genealogical trees for Arabs are largely from the early Islamic period, and these genealogies were meticulously recorded by historians, genealogists, and scholars.

==== Genealogy of Muhammad ====
One of the most famous early genealogical trees in the Arab world is that of Muhammad. His genealogy was carefully documented in various Islamic texts, and it traces his lineage to Ishmael, the son of Abraham. The family tree is crucial in establishing the Muhammad's lineage. This line of descent is known as the Hashemite lineage, originating from Hashim, a forefather of Muhammad, and it remains one of the most revered lineages in the Arab world. The early Islamic genealogist Ibn Hajar al-Asqalani (1372–1449) compiled a monumental work called "Kitab al-Ansab", which documents the genealogies of various Arab tribes. His work was based on earlier genealogical sources and serves as a foundational resource for understanding Arab tribal and familial lineages. Another important historical figure, Ibn Khaldun (1332–1406), a famous historian and philosopher, included discussions on genealogy in his renowned work, Muqaddimah. In his writing, he explored the role of tribes and lineages in Arab society, and this work contributed to the study of genealogies as part of social and political structures. Ancient Arab society was deeply rooted in the concept of tribal affiliation. The family tree often extended across large tribal networks that governed the social and political dynamics of pre-Islamic Arabia. Families like the Quraysh tribe (to which Muhammad belonged) and the Banu Hashim clan were particularly significant. In these tribes, each family, or bayt, would have its own genealogical history, and knowing one's ancestry was considered essential for social status, marriage eligibility, and political power. Genealogies also served as a form of social security. By tracing one's family history back to notable ancestors, a family could bolster its claim to land, resources, or power. It also ensured that family members could protect themselves against challenges to their status or inheritance. The science of genealogy (Ilm al-Ansab) became a recognized scholarly field within the Arab world. Scholars and experts in genealogy would specialize in documenting, analyzing, and preserving genealogical records for the Arab tribes. This process led to the creation of family trees that not only had historical value but also served as political tools, especially in contexts where tribal affiliation played a key role in gaining or maintaining power. While recorded family trees in the Arab world can be back to the early Islamic period, with prominent examples like the genealogy of Muhammad and scholarly works by figures like Ibn Khaldun and Ibn Hajar al-Asqalani, the practice of preserving and documenting family lineages has ancient roots in Arab culture. Tribal identity and genealogical knowledge were integral to the social fabric of pre-Islamic Arabia and continue to play a significant role in modern Arab societies. The family tree, therefore, has always been a crucial part of Arab heritage, not just as a way of tracing descent but as a means of preserving cultural identity and social structure.

=== Elsewhere ===
Elsewhere, in many human cultures, clan and tribal associations are based on claims of common ancestry, although detailed documentation of those origins is often very limited.

=== Global ===
Forms of family trees are also used in genetic genealogy. In 2022, scientists reported the largest detailed human genetic genealogy, that unifies human genomes from many sources for insights about human history, ancestry and evolution and demonstrates a novel computational method for estimating how human DNA is related via a series of 13 million linked trees along the genome, a tree-sequence, which has been described as the largest "human family tree".

== See also ==
- GEDCOM
- List of family trees
- Kinship terminology
