= Numerical variation in kinship terms =

Variations in the number of lexical categories across the languages is a notable idea in cultural anthropology. A former study on "color terms" explores such variations. Brent Berlin and Paul Kay (1969) argued that these qualitative and quantitative differences can be organized into a coherent hierarchy. As far as kinship terms are concerned, the variation is not found as an hierarchical organization, but as a result of conditions or constraints. That is to say, the number of kinship terms varies across the languages because of sociocultural conditions or constraints on the biological traits.

== Table ==
Numerical Range	Languages
21-25	Afrikaans, Dutch, Yiddish, Icelandic, German, Norwegian, Belarusian, Czech, Macedonian, Slovak, Slovenia and Ukrainian
26-30	Danish, Faroese, Swedish, Italian, French, Occitan, Catalan, Spanish, Galician, Portuguese, Romanian, Bulgarian, Croatian, Russian and Serbian
31-35	Breton, Welsh, Irish Gaelic, Cornish, Telugu and Kannad
35-40	Malay, Tuvaluan, Hungarian, Polish, Tamil and Malayalam
40-45	Manx
61-65	Hindi, Bengali, Gujrati, Rajasthani and Marathi
66-70	Cantonese, Hakka, Mandarin and Taiwanese

== Introduction ==
This article does not include all the studies on kinship, but only those relevant studies which indicate a relation with the number of kinship terms. References include: first, of course the base, the 1871 Systems of Consanguinity and Affinity of the Human Family by Lewis H. Morgan; second, the 1949 'Social Structure' by George Peter Murdock; and third, the 1949 "Elementary Structures of Kinship" by Claude Lévi-Strauss. In a succession to these studies on kinship terminology study of Saxena R. T. (2012) on Hindi and Telugu kinship terminology explained the variations in the number of kinship terms.

=== Classical patterns ===
Morgan's (see in kinship) (1871) work is well known for six classical patterns. These patterns were based on two kinds of terminological systems: 1)descriptive and 2)classificatory. Descriptive systems have the terms indicating unique relatives, whereas classificatory systems classify relatives in a term on the basis of generalization. Collateral merging is one of the example (see more in Morgan, 1871). A classificatory system, by definition, implies relatively less term; and a descriptive system more terms. Morgan was not interested in the number of the terms but in the distribution of the terms.

=== Features ===
Murdock's (1949) explanation was an attempt to define kinship terminology in terms of distinctive features and deterministic factors. He described nine features on the basis of which a term can be said as a classificatory term or as a descriptive term. Some features are age, affinity, polarity, generation, gender (see more in Murdock, 1949). He explained that number of factors (such as morphological, social, psychological etc.) are the factors which determine whether a terminology will describe or classify relatives. It was the first time when an attempt towards numerical evaluation of kinship terms was made. Though for Morgan too number was not the primary concern but the concern was "nuclear family".

=== Famous analogy ===
Claude Lévi-Strauss (1969) came up with a new approach. His first idea (in 1969) was that 'the culture is universal and innate'. His ideas (in 1969) resemble the impact of structural linguistics. In linguistics Phonemes are known as the realization of hidden neurological binary opposition. On the same principle Claude Lévi-Strauss (1969) claimed that culture is a realization of some hidden property. Though in the case of culture the universal property is not neurological but "Attitudinal". Latter in 2004 he showed, taking examples from different culture, that how attitudinal opposition construct the structure of kinship terms.

== Numerical variation ==
Humans have a set of distinctive features (known as phonetic features), and by this set they can produce any speech sound (phoneme) of any human language. BUT NOTE: a particular language have limited features and phonemes, thus speaker of language A may not produce phonemes of language B. In this way a particular language is a "Constraint" on the ability of humans to produces many more speech sounds. On the same schema Saxena R. T. (2012) claims that Kinship terms are formed on some biological features (like "gene" and "sexuality") and some social features ("consanguinity" and "affinity"). The former is universal and latter is particular. Say every one have sexual instinct by birth but it is the society that constrains the use of this ability to the limited members by exogamy. Exogamy vary cross culturally, so the number of kinship term. Take an example from Hindi (Hindu Brahmin in North India. They can not may within the kinship group of birth. On the other hand, take Telugu speakers (Reddi caste) into account, they can marry the child of mother's brother. The result of kin-group exogamy among Hindi speaking Hindu is that they have EXTRA terms for IN-LAW RELATIVES, on the contrary Telugu speakers LACK those terms for in-laws. THUS there is a variation in the number. Based on these examples four classes of relatives were declared:

1. Consanglineal Relatives
2. Consanglateral Relatives
3. Affilateral Relatives and
4. Affilineal relatives.

Kingroup-exogamous systems have the four classes whereas kin-group endogamous systems have only three (first three) classes. We should note that the features such as relative age, gender, generation etc. are also responsible for numerical variations.
