= Eitzing =

- Municipality
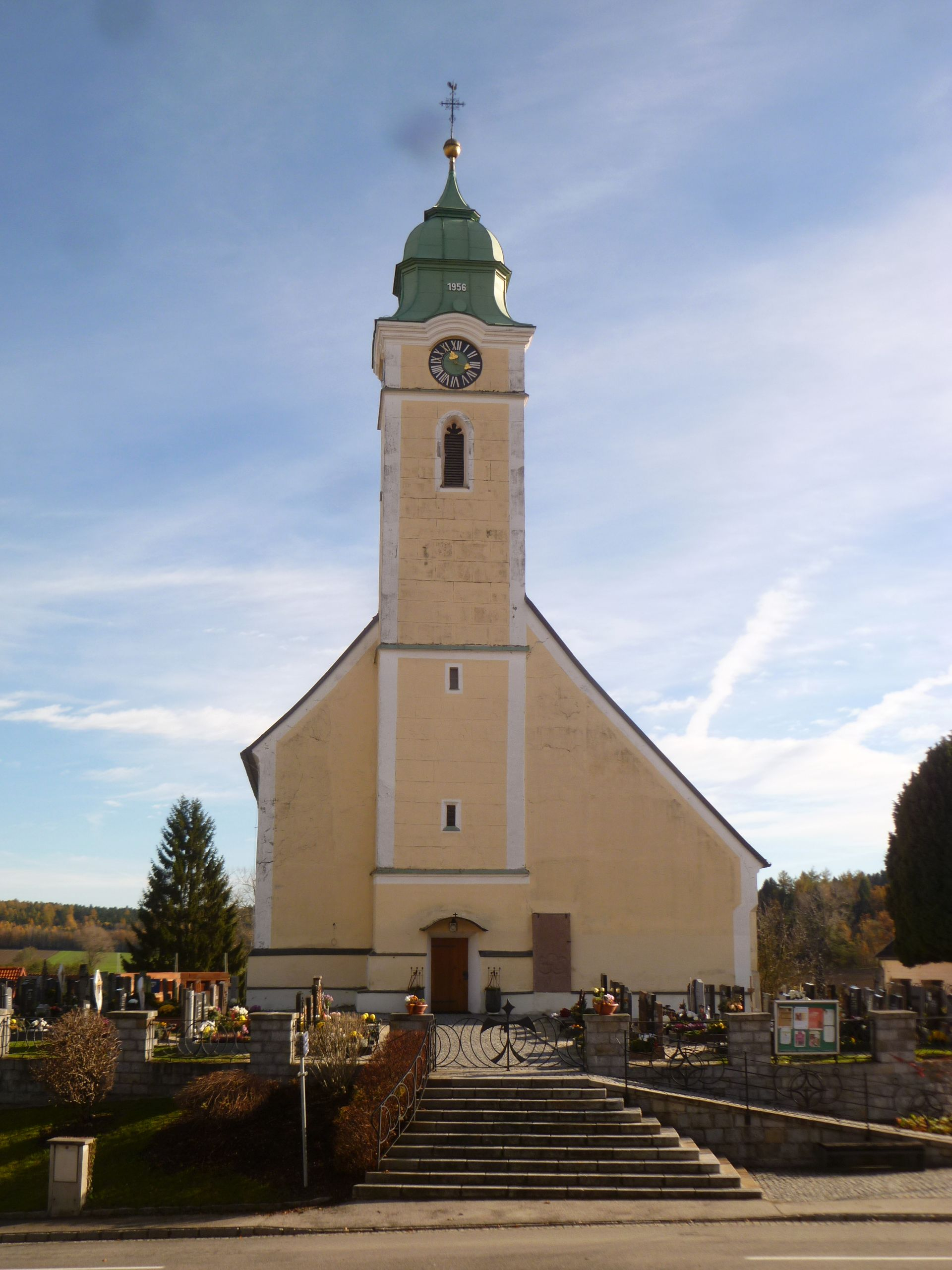

- Coat of arms

- Location within Austria
- Coordinates: 48°0′0″N 13°0′0″E
- Country: Austria
- State: Upper Austria
- District: Ried im Innkreis

Government
  - Mayor: Friedrich Freund (ÖVP)

Area
  - Total: 8.61 km^{2} (3.32 sq mi)
- Elevation: 423 m (1,388 ft)

Population (2018-01-01)
  - Total: 805
  - Density: 93.5/km^{2} (242/sq mi)
- Time zone: UTC+1 (CET)
  - Summer (DST): UTC+2 (CEST)
- Postal code: 4970, 4971, 4973 und 4941
- Area code: 07752, 07751
- Vehicle registration: RI
- Website: www.eitzing.at

Eitzing is a municipality in the district of Ried im Innkreis in the Austrian state of Upper Austria.

== Geography ==
Eitzing is situated 419 m above sea level in the Innviertel. Its dimensions are 4,6 km from the North to the South and 4,3 km from the West to the East. The complete area accounts for 8,62 km^{2}. 13,8% of the land is afforested, 77% is used agriculturally. Parts of the municipality are Amerika, Bankham, Ertlberg, Hofing, Kirchberg, Obereitzing, Probenzing, Sausack, Untereitzing, Ursprung and Wöppelhub.

== Population ==
Historical population
Year	Pop.	±%
1869	658	—
1880	659	+0.2%
1890	640	−2.9%
1900	659	+3.0%
1910	656	−0.5%
1923	642	−2.1%
1934	652	+1.6%
1939	615	−5.7%
1951	724	+17.7%
1961	591	−18.4%
1971	596	+0.8%
1981	630	+5.7%
1991	630	+0.0%
2001	658	+4.4%
2013	728	+10.6%

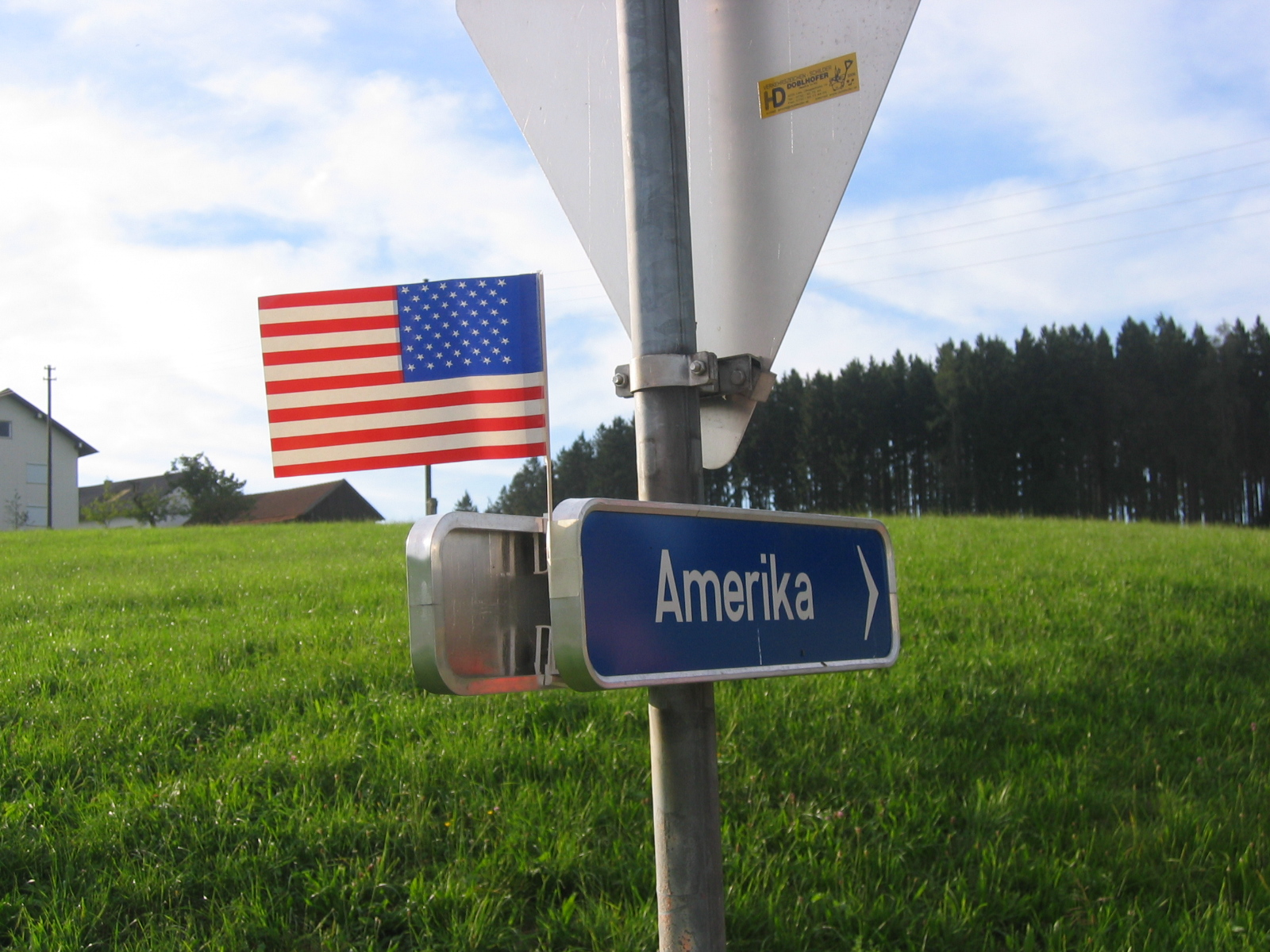
Amerika, an oddly named part of Eitzing
