= Pedigree chart =

Diagram showing the occurrence of traits

A chart documenting the ancestry of a particular trait. In this pedigree, a family history of sickle cell anemia is traced.

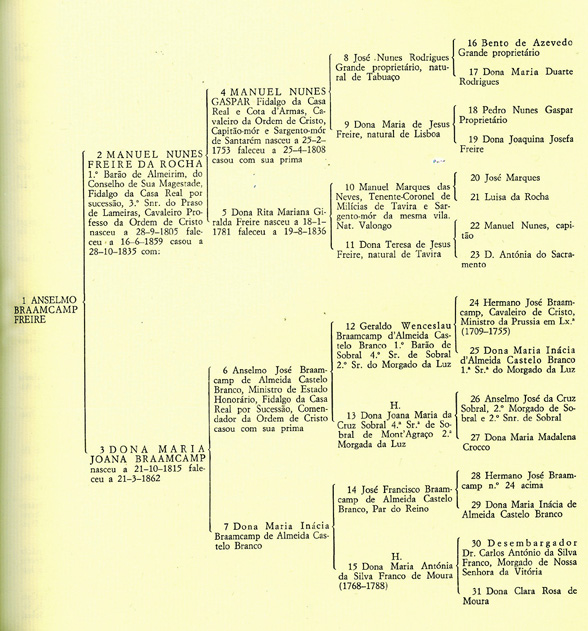
Example of a pedigree chart using Ahnentafel numbering

A pedigree chart is a diagram that shows the occurrence of certain traits through different generations of a family, most commonly for humans and animal breed registration (show dogs and cats, and race horses).

== Definition ==
The word pedigree is a corruption of the Anglo-Norman French pé de grue or "crane's foot", either because the typical lines and split lines (each split leading to different offspring of the one parent line) resemble the thin leg and foot of a crane or because such a mark was used to denote succession in pedigree charts.

A pedigree results in the presentation of family information in the form of an easily readable chart. It can be simply called a "family tree". Pedigrees use a standardized set of symbols, squares represent males and circles represent females. Pedigree construction is a family history, and details about an earlier generation may be uncertain as memories fade. If the sex of the person is unknown, a diamond is used. Someone with the phenotype (trait) in question is represented by a filled-in (darker) symbol. Heterozygotes, when identifiable, are indicated by a shaded dot inside a symbol or a half-filled symbol.

Relationships in a pedigree are shown as a series of lines. A horizontal line connects parents and a vertical line leads to their offspring. The offspring are connected by a horizontal sibship line and listed in birth order from left to right. If the offspring are twins then they will be connected by a triangle. If an offspring dies then its symbol will be crossed by a line. If the offspring is stillborn or aborted, it is represented by a small triangle.

Each generation is identified by a Roman numeral (I, II, III, and so on), and each individual within the same generation is identified by an Arabic numeral (1, 2, 3, and so on). Analysis of the pedigree using the principles of Mendelian inheritance can determine whether a trait has a dominant or recessive pattern of inheritance. Pedigrees are often constructed after a family member afflicted with a genetic disorder has been identified. This individual, known as the proband, is indicated on the pedigree by an arrow. These changes may occur yearly or monthly.

In a Y-linked disorder, only males can be affected. If the father is affected all sons will be affected. It also does not skip a generation.

Mitochondrial disorders are only passed on if the mother is affected. If the mother is affected, all offspring will be affected. If the father is affected, he does not pass the disorder on to his offspring.

In an autosomal recessive disorder, it is possible for both parents to not express the trait but, if both are carriers, for their offspring to express the trait. Autosomal recessive disorders typically skip a generation, so affected offspring typically have unaffected parents. With an autosomal recessive disorder, both males and females are equally likely to be affected.

Autosomal dominant disorders do not skip a generation, so affected offspring have affected parents. One parent must have the disorder for their offspring to be affected. Both males and females are equally likely to be affected, so it is an autosomal disorder.

In an X-linked recessive disorder, males are more likely to be affected than females. Affected sons typically have unaffected mothers. The father also must be affected for the daughter to be affected, and the mother must be affected or a carrier for the daughter to be affected. The disorder is also never passed from father to son. Only females can be carriers for the disorders. X-linked recessive disorders also typically skip a generation.

In an X-linked dominant disorder, if the father is affected, all daughters will be affected and no sons will be affected. It does not skip a generation, and the mother has a 50% chance of passing it on to her offspring if she is affected.

== In human use ==
In England and Wales pedigrees are officially recorded in the College of Arms, which has records going back to the Middle Ages, including pedigrees collected during roving inquiries by its heralds during the sixteenth and seventeenth centuries. The purpose of these heraldic visitations was to register and regulate the use of coats of arms. Those who claimed the right to bear arms had to provide proof either of a grant of arms to them by the College, or of descent from an ancestor entitled to arms. It was for this reason that pedigrees were recorded by the visitations. Pedigrees continue to be registered at the College of Arms and kept up to date on a voluntary basis but are not accessible to the general public without payment of a fee.

More visible, therefore, are the pedigrees recorded in published works, such as Burke's Peerage and Burke's Landed Gentry in the United Kingdom and, in continental Europe by the Almanach de Gotha.

A pedigree may be used to establish the probability of a child having a particular disorder or condition. It may be used to discover where the genes in question are located (x, y, or autosome chromosome), and to determine whether a trait is dominant or recessive. When a pedigree shows a condition appearing in a 50:50 ratio between men and women, it is considered autosomal. When the condition predominantly affects males in the pedigree, it is considered x-linked.

Some examples of dominant traits include male baldness, astigmatism, and dwarfism. Some examples of recessive traits include small eyes, little body hair, and tall stature.

== In animal husbandry ==
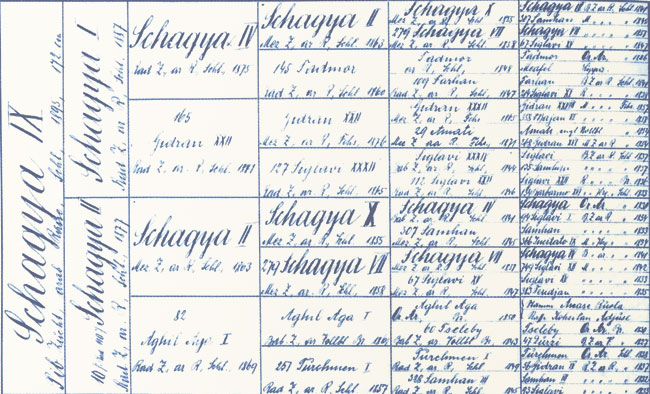
Pedigree of horse Shagya IX b. 1895

In the practice of selective breeding of animals, particularly in animal fancy and livestock, including horses, pedigree charts are used to track the ancestry of animals and assist in the planning of suitable breeding programs to enhance desirable traits. Breed registries are formed and are dedicated to the accurate tracking of pedigrees and maintaining accurate records of birth, death, and identifying characteristics of each registered animal.

== See also ==
- Ahnentafel
- Cousin charts
- Family tree
- Genealogical numbering systems
- Genogram
- Foundation bloodstock
- Certificate of Degree of Indian Blood
- MRCA
