= Family tree mapping =

Family tree overlaid onto 19th century map of London

Family tree mapping is the process of geocoding places in family tree files to produce geospatial data suitable for viewing with a virtual globe or 2D mapping program.

== Overview ==
The availability of several free applications for viewing geographic data has led to a growing interest in the use of this technology by genealogists and family history researchers.

The ability to share keyhole markup language (KML) files through sites such as Google Maps means that researchers can find matches based on geographic location rather than just a place name.

== Family tree mapping applications ==
Genealogy software that can be used for family tree mapping include:

- Ahnenblatt using the supplied Google-Earth Plug-In.
- Ancestral Quest
- Family Historian
- Family Tree Builder
- Family Tree Maker
- GEDitCOM II
- GenealogyJ
- GenoPro - a Windows Genealogy software, whose Report Generator has ability to convert Places and geographical locations and export them in Google Maps.
- Gramps
- Heredis
- Legacy Family Tree automatically map where your ancestors lived.
- MacFamilyTree
- RootsMagic

Utility applications that can be used for family tree mapping include:

- AniMap- contains historical maps that show the changing county boundaries
- Centennia Historical Atlas - the map forward or backward in time from the year 1000 to present.
- Family Atlas - a Windows application that imports data from genealogy software for mapping with its own internal maps.
- Map My Ancestors (as of 3 October 2011 this application was withdrawn from sale and no longer available, due to closure of Yahoo Mapping services see the source site for details) - a Windows application that imports GEDCOM files or comma-separated values (CSV) files and converts them to keyhole markup language (KML) files for viewing with KML compatible programs such as Google Earth or Google Maps.
- Map My Family Tree - a Windows application that imports data directly from a number of popular Genealogy programs. The program uses its own location database to resolve places from the source family tree. Viewing data is generally undertaken from within the program using the internal viewer but individual placemarks can be viewed using Google Earth, Google Maps, TerraServer-USA or MapQuest.

== See also ==
- Google Earth Virtual Globe software
- Google Maps
- Keyhole Markup Language (KML)
- Bing Maps Platform
