= Comparison of web-based genealogy software =

This article compares several selected genealogy programs that run on a web server. Genealogy websites are not included.

== General information ==
Software	Latest release		License	Free to use
Software	Version	Date	License	Free to use
Evagene	2.0	2026-04-15	Proprietary	Yes
GeneWeb	7.1.0-beta2	2025-12-25	GPL-2.0-or-later	Yes
Gramps Web	26.1.1	2026-01-30	AGPL-3.0-or-later	Yes
HuMo-genealogy	5.9	2022-01-28	GPL-3.0-only	Yes
PhpGedView	4.3.0	2017-11-07	GPL-2.0-or-later	Yes
The Next Generation of Genealogy Sitebuilding (TNG)	15.0.1	2025-03-06	Proprietary	No
webtrees	2.2.6	2026-04-29	GPL-3.0-or-later	Yes

== System support ==
Software	Operating system	Programming language	Database
Evagene	OS Independent	Python	?
GeneWeb	OS Independent	OCaml	Geneweb's own format
Gramps Web	OS Independent	JavaScript, Python	SQLite, Postgresql
HuMo-gen	OS Independent	JavaScript, PHP	MySQL
PhpGedView	OS Independent	JavaScript, PHP 4.3 or higher	MySQL, Postgresql, SQLite, and SQL-Server
TNG	OS Independent	JavaScript, PHP 7.0 or higher required	MySQL 5.7 or higher recommended
webtrees	OS Independent	JavaScript, PHP 7.4 or higher	MySQL 5.7 or higher, MariaDB, Postgresql, SQLite, and SQL-Server

== General features ==
Software	Administration	Family View	GEDCOM	Histories	Individual View	Mapping	Notes	Places	Photos	Recording	Simple and Advanced Search	Sources	Video	WordPress integration
Evagene	Yes	Yes	Yes	Yes	Yes	Yes	Yes	Yes	Yes	Yes	Yes	Yes	No	No
GeneWeb	Yes	Yes	Yes	Yes	Yes	?	Yes	Yes	Yes	?	Yes	Yes	No	No
Gramps Web	Yes	Yes	Yes	Yes	Yes	Yes	Yes	Yes	Yes	Yes	Yes	Yes	Yes	No
HuMo-genealogy	Yes	Yes	Yes	Yes	Yes	Yes	Yes	Yes	Yes	Yes	Yes	Yes	Yes	No
PhpGedView	Yes	Yes	Yes	No	Yes	Yes	Yes	Yes	Yes	Yes	Yes	Yes	Yes	No
TNG	Yes	Yes	Yes	Yes	Yes	Yes	Yes	Yes	Yes	Yes	Yes	Yes	Yes	Yes
webtrees	Yes	Yes	Yes	Yes	Yes	Yes	Yes	Yes	Yes	Yes	Yes	Yes	Yes	No

== Chart features ==
Software	Ancestry Chart	Descendancy Chart	Relationship Calculator	Timeline Chart
Evagene	Yes	Yes	Yes	No
GeneWeb	Yes	Yes	Yes	No
Gramps Web	Yes	Yes	Yes	Yes
HuMo-genealogy	Yes	Yes	Yes	Yes
PhpGedView	Yes	Yes	Yes	Yes
TNG	Yes	Yes	Yes	Yes
webtrees	Yes	Yes	Yes	Yes

== Site administration features ==
Software	Backup	Custom Events	Duplicate Finder	Merge Data	Mod Manager	Multiple Trees	Privacy Settings	Help	Site Templates and Customization
Evagene	Yes	?	?	Yes	No	Yes	Yes	Yes	Yes
GeneWeb	Yes	Yes	Yes	Yes	No	Yes	Yes	Yes	Yes
Gramps Web	Yes	Yes	No	No	No	Yes	Yes	No	No
HuMo-genealogy	Yes	Yes	Yes	Yes	Yes	Yes	Yes	Yes	Yes
PhpGedView	Yes	?	No	?	No	Yes	Yes	Yes	Yes
TNG	Yes	Yes	Yes	Yes	Yes	Yes	Yes	Yes	Yes
webtrees	Yes	Yes	Yes	Yes	Yes	Yes	Yes	Yes	Yes

== Visitor features ==
Software	Anniversary Calendar	Bookmarking	Photo Gallery	PDF Reports	Relationship Finder	RSS Feed	User Account Registration	Multilingual
Evagene	No	No	No	Yes	No	No	Yes	No
GeneWeb	Yes	?	Yes	?	Yes	No	Yes	Yes
Gramps Web	Yes	Yes	Yes	Yes	No	No	Yes	Yes
HuMo-genealogy	Yes	Yes	Yes	Yes	Yes	Yes	Yes	Yes
PhpGedView	Yes	Yes	Yes	Yes	Yes	Yes	Yes	Yes
TNG	Yes	Yes	Yes	Yes	Yes	Yes	Yes	Yes
webtrees	Yes	Yes	Yes	Yes	Yes	Yes	Yes	Yes

== See also ==
- List of genealogy databases
