= TreeDraw =

- Original author(s): Nick Hunter
- Developer(s): SpanSoft
- Initial release: August 1994; 30 years ago
- Stable release: 4.4.2 / February 6, 2017; 8 years ago
- Operating system: Windows XP and later
- Size: 5MB
- Available in: English (Customizable output for other languages)
- Type: Genealogy software
- License: Shareware
- Website: treedraw.spansoft.org

TreeDraw is a genealogy program for computers running Microsoft Windows. The program is a chart editor which aids family historians in creating and printing family trees. Developed by SpanSoft, Scotland, the software is distributed as shareware with a free trial period.

== Features ==
TreeDraw is essentially a vector graphics editor which creates various styles of family tree charts using data imported from external sources such as GEDCOM files or Kith and Kin Pro databases. The program allows user manipulation of the imported charts using features common to most drawing programs such as element repositioning and scaling.

== File formats ==
The program stores data in .TDR (TreeDraw chart) files, TreeDraw's native format. A freeware .TDR file viewer is available. TreeDraw will import data from GEDCOM files or from Kith and Kin Pro databases. The program also exports Adobe PDF files.

== History ==
The program was first developed by Nick Hunter as a Windows 3.1 program and released as shareware in 1994. In 2001 the first TreeDraw Legacy Edition was released, a special edition of the program which imports data directly from Legacy Family Tree data files.

- TreeDraw version 1 was released in October 1994.
- TreeDraw version 2 was released in March 2001.
- TreeDraw Legacy Edition version 2 was released in April 2001 (there was no V1 of this edition).
- TreeDraw version 3 was released on 26 April 2009.
- TreeDraw Legacy Edition version 3 was released on 26 April 2009.
- TreeDraw version 4 was released on 2 January 2012.
- TreeDraw Legacy Edition version 4 was released on 8 May 2013.

== Awards ==
TreeDraw V1 received the PC Plus Value Award in the October 1996 edition of PC Plus Magazine.
