= Genealogica Grafica =

- Original author: Tom de Neef
- Release: 2006
- Stable release: 1.26.3 / 24 October 2021; 5 years ago
- Operating system: Windows
- Available in: Multilingual
- Type: Genealogy software
- License: Freeware
- Website: www.genealogicagrafica.nl

Genealogica Grafica is a utility for the creation of genealogical charts and reports for web publishing. Genealogica Grafica relies on genealogy software to produce the GEDCOM file; it requires as an input and checks the GEDCOM for consistency of the data and produces a variety of web reports.

== History ==
In 2006, the first release of Genealogica Grafica replaced KStableau. As of version 1.23, the program is freeware, and a license key is no longer required for the advanced functions.

== Data validation ==
The program is very thorough in checking the input GEDCOM for inconsistencies. This includes verifying the consistency of the inter-and intra-family links and the dates of the recorded events, trivial mistakes (such as recording 1931 instead of 1913), missing marriages (when two childbirths are very far apart) and double entries. In principle, it can also signal misspellings of birth places, using an international geographic database. The utility can detect and localise circular references in the GEDCOM.

== Reports ==
Genealogica Grafica reports can clearly show inter-marriage, cross-relationships.
