= Genbox Family History =

Windows-Based Geneaology Software

- Version 3.7.1, showing an individual screen, citations, and part of a descendant chart
- Original author: William T. Flight
- Developer: Thoughtful Creations
- Release: 1992; 34 years ago
- Stable release: 3.7.1 / 16 November 2007; 18 years ago
- Operating system: Windows
- Available in: Multilingual (11 languages/dialects)
- Type: Genealogy software
- License: Proprietary software
- Website: www.genbox.com

Genbox Family History is genealogy software for Windows, developed by Thoughtful Creations. It functions as a database, a research planner and task organizer, a data analyzer, a chart producer, and a report writer. It was originally released for MS-DOS in 1993.

== Features ==
- Support for complex relationships among individuals, events, dates, places, and source citations: multiple personal names and identifiers, optionally linked to defining events, can be stored for individuals. Accurate relationships between each child and any number or type (biological, adoptive, foster, step, etc.) of parents can be stored. Any number of event types, attributes, and flags can be defined. Witnesses to events can be recorded, along with their roles.
- An unlimited number of event types and source types are supported with a sophisticated, multi-language template system. Event sentences and citation formats can be customized by the user.
- Reports can be generated in RTF and HTML format.
- Multimedia support for images, audio, and video
- Full Unicode support, GEDCOM import and export.

== History ==
Genbox version 1.0 was originally released in 1992 as a MS-DOS-based charting application.

Genbox version 2.0 was released in 1994.

Work began on the Windows version of Genbox Family History in August 1998

=== Windows release history ===
- Genbox 3.0: Feb 02, 2003. Included support for multiple names and parent relationships, witnesses, templates for event and source citations.
- Genbox 3.1.5: Oct 18, 2003
- Genbox 3.2: Jun 20, 2004
- Genbox 3.3: Oct 23, 2004
- Genbox 3.4: Apr 30, 2005
- Genbox 3.5: Jul 9, 2005
- Genbox 3.6: Oct 2, 2005
- Genbox 3.7: Feb 3, 2007
- Genbox 3.7.1: Nov 16, 2007

== File format ==
Genbox's underlying database engine is stored using the Access Database Engine (ACE/JET): the Genbox database can be opened in Microsoft Access.

- Format and structure of Genbox databases (.GDB) -Last Updated: 3 July 2006 for Version 3.6.5
