= Genealogy (disambiguation) =

Genealogy also known as family history, is the study of families and the tracing of their lineages and history.

Genealogy may also refer to:

- Genealogy (philosophy), a method for the study of history through a holistic analysis of culture, societal structures and power dynamics
- Genealogy (linguistics), the connection between two or more languages descended from a common ancestor language
- Genealogy (band), 6-member supergroup representing Armenia for the 2015 Eurovision Song Contest
- Academic genealogy, a 'family tree' of scientists and scholars according to mentoring relationships
- Genetic genealogy, inferring genetic relationships between individuals via genetic data

== See also ==
- List of genetic genealogy topics
- Genealogy book, register used to record the family history of ancestors
- Genealogy tree, alternative term for Family tree
- Genealogy software, computer software used to record, organize, and publish genealogical data
- GenealogyJ, software for editors for genealogic data, hobbyists, family historians and genealogy researchers
