= The Master Genealogist =

Genealogy software, 1993-2014

- Original author: Bob Velke
- Developer: Wholly Genes Software
- Initial release: July 1993; 32 years ago (Pre-release: 1991; 35 years ago)
- Final release: 9.05.0000 / 3 December 2014; 11 years ago
- Written in: Visual FoxPro
- Operating system: Microsoft Windows
- Available in: 10 languages
- List of languages English (US), English (UK), German, Dutch, French, Danish, Norwegian Bokmål, Swedish, Italian, and Afrikaans
- Type: Genealogy software
- License: Proprietary
- Website: whollygenes.com

The Master Genealogist (TMG) is genealogy software originally created by Bob Velke for Microsoft DOS in 1993, with a version for Microsoft Windows released in 1996. Data entry was customized through the use of user-defined events, names, and relationship types. Official support for TMG ceased at the end of 2014. Informal support continues through a number of online user groups.

== Features ==
- Designed for both normal users and genealogy professionals
- Flexibly displays information
- Has elaborate database-oriented support for source and citation information
- Supports the inclusion of media files
- Supports DNA information
- Allows the user to record conflicting evidence
- Allows a "Surety" of a given piece of evidence to be recorded
- Supports elaborate chart-making
- Supports smart importing of genealogy files. Its GenBridge recognizes many common genealogy data format files from other programs and imports genealogical data directly into TMG. This minimizes the loss of data when transferred from other software and avoids some of the problems caused by transferring files through the limited but universal GEDCOM format.

== Source types ==
The default source types in the standard edition are based on Wholly Genes' interpretation of Elizabeth Shown Mills's Evidence! Citation & Analysis for the Family Historian. Source templates based upon Wholly Genes' interpretation of the source types in Richard S. Lackey's Cite Your Sources are also provided. The source templates in the UK edition are based on designs by Caroline Gurney for sources commonly encountered in the United Kingdom.

== Platforms ==
From version 2 onwards TMG was designed to run on the Windows platform but can be run on Macintosh and Linux machines using a Windows emulator.

== Limitations ==
- TMG did not support Unicode, which limits data entry to the Western European (Latin) character set.
- Before TMG version 8, reports generated on computers with 64-bit operating systems (only) were limited to "txt", HTML and PDF output, although popular word processor reporting formats were supported on 32-bit platforms. The print routine was rewritten for the current version (v 9.05) of the program eliminating this restriction.
- Some users have complained about the limitations in the program's multilingual support in narratives. This issue is focused on personal pronoun and other individual word replacement resulting in output that may have minor grammatical errors.

== TMG version history ==
Please press show for more information on past versions.

TMG version history

	Meaning
Red	Not supported
Yellow	Still supported (Update to the last patch for that version)
Green	Current version
Blue	Public beta version
Edition/s	From v3.5 TMG was separated into a Gold and Silver version. From v5 TMG was separated into: Gold (U.S.A), Gold UK, Silver (U.S.A), Silver UK.

Version	Release date	Edition/s	Notes
TMG v.XX	1991	pre-release	-
TMG v.99	Feb, 1993	pre-release	-
TMG v1.0	Jul 1993	DOS	-
TMG v1.1	Nov 1994	DOS	Upgrade/Patch
TMG v1.1b	Feb 1994	DOS	Upgrade/Patch
TMG v1.2	21 Apr 1995	DOS	Upgrade/Patch
TMG v1.2a	Nov 1995	DOS	Upgrade/Patch
TMGW v2.0	Oct 1996	Windows 3.1	-
TMGW v2.3	Feb 1997	Windows 3.1	Upgrade/Patch
TMG/Win v3.0 Gold Edition	May 1997	Windows 3.1	-
v3.5 Windows	April 1998	Split into separate Gold and Silver Editions.	Upgrade/Patch. GenBridge Introduced.
v3.6 Windows	Aug 1998		Upgrade/Patch
v3.6a Windows	Sep 1998		Upgrade/Patch
v3.7 Windows	Dec 1998		Upgrade/Patch
v4.0	May 1999	Windows 95	Ancestral Genealogical Reference Library supplied on the second CD-ROM. Based on FoxPro v2.6. Visual Chartform v1 introduced.
v4.0a	15 Aug 2000	-	Upgrade/Patch
v4.0b (UK edition)	2000	-	Upgrade/Patch. First British edition.
v4.0c	3 Nov 2000	-	Upgrade/Patch. TMG v4.0a version updated directly to v4.0c
v4.0d	20 Feb 2001	-	Upgrade/Patch. Visual Chartform (VCF) v1.2
v5.00	22 May 2002	Split into separate USA and UK versions.	Based on Visual FoxPro v6.
v5.01.000	25 May 2002	-	Upgrade/Patch.
v5.02.000	15 Jun 2002	-	Upgrade/Patch.
v5.03.000	22 Aug 2002	-	Upgrade/Patch. Visual Chartform (VCF) v2.1.
v5.04.000	09 Nov 2002	-	Upgrade/Patch.
v5.05.000	04 Mar 2003	-	Upgrade/Patch.
v5.06.000	08 Apr 2003	-	Upgrade/Patch.
v5.07.000	28 Apr 2003	-	Upgrade/Patch.
v5.08.000	15 Jul 2003	-	Upgrade/Patch.
v5.09.000	12 Aug 2003	-	Upgrade/Patch. Visual Chartform (VCF) v2.1.0.592
v5.10.000	21 Nov 2003	-	Upgrade/Patch.
v5.11.000	05 Dec 2003	-	Upgrade/Patch.
v5.12.000	21 Apr 2004	-	Upgrade/Patch. Visual Chartform (VCF) v3.0
v5.13.000	17 May 2004	-	Upgrade/Patch.
v5.14.000	07 Jun 2004	-	Upgrade/Patch.
v5.15.000	25 Jul 2004	-	Upgrade/Patch.
v6.00	21 Dec 2004	-	Based on Visual FoxPro v7
v6.01.000	28 May 2005	-	Upgrade/Patch.
v6.02.000	11 Aug 2005	-	Upgrade/Patch.
v6.03.000	02 Sep 2005	-	Upgrade/Patch.
v6.04.000	27 Sep 2005	-	Upgrade/Patch.
v6.05.000	30 Oct 2005	-	Upgrade/Patch.
v6.06.000	04 Nov 2005	-	Upgrade/Patch.
v6.07.000	04 Nov 2005	-	Upgrade/Patch.
v6.08.000	24 Mar 2006	-	Upgrade/Patch.
v6.09.000	3 May 2006	-	Upgrade/Patch.
v6.10.000	09 Oct 2006	-	Upgrade/Patch.
v6.11.000	15 Oct 2006	-	Upgrade/Patch.
v6.12.000	04 Nov 2006	TMG updated to run as a legacy application under Windows Vista	Upgrade/Patch. Visual Chartform (VCF) v3.2.0.2 (Note:VCF uses http://freeimage.sourceforge.net freeimage.sf.net])
v7.00	28 Dec 2007	Windows Vista (Support for 98, NT dropped)	Based on Visual FoxPro v9. CD-ROM version of TMG includes a free copy of The Universal British Directory of Great Britain 1791.
v7.01.000	18 April 2008	-	Upgrade/Patch. Visual Chartform (VCF) v3.2.0.13 (Build date:1 Sep 2007).
v7.02.000	24 May 2008	-	Upgrade/Patch.
v7.03.000	28 Jun 2008	-	Upgrade/Patch.
v7.04.000	13 Feb 2009	-	Upgrade/Patch.
v8.00.000	21 Dec 2011	Support for: Windows 7, 64-bit	
v8.01.000	19 Jan 2012		Upgrade/Patch.
v8.02.000	2 Mar 2012	Released, withdrawn, and re-released.	Upgrade/Patch.
v8.03.000	1 May 2012		Upgrade/Patch, Add Swedish language
v8.04.000	3 May 2012		Upgrade/Patch, Add Dutch language support files
v8.05.000	22 March 2013	-	Upgrade/Patch. Major redesign of how Roles are stored in the database, Add support for WordPerfect, Add search in Subfolders
v8.06.000	28 Mar 2013		Upgrade/Patch.
v8.07.000	19 April 2013		Upgrade/Patch.
v8.08.000	22 April 2013		Upgrade/Patch.
v9.00.000	7 February 2014		
v9.01.000	26 February 2014		Upgrade/Patch.
v9.02.000	10 Jul 2014		Upgrade/Patch.
v9.03.000	17 Jul 2014		Upgrade/Patch.
v9.04.000	24 Sep 2014		Upgrade/Patch. A new GEDCOM export option has been added to facilitate transferring TMG data to other programs.
v9.05.000	3 Dec 2014		Upgrade/Patch.

== Migration from TMG ==
=== GEDCOM ===
TMG has elaborate and detailed support for sources in a database format where a source can be referred to by any other record. In the GEDCOM database specification, sources can be attached to any number of individuals or multiple families, by attaching to any number of facts for that individual or family. Exporting a TMG database involves duplicating the sources into each place where a given source is used. All of the information is exported, but the structure of each source is lost permanently.

An example is when there is a census or ship's record that lists many members of an extended family. TMG allows each individual's entry to refer to a common source record, which can itself have an elaborate description. GEDCOM also allows every fact in that census or ship record to apply to a single source, it's simply a matter of tagging the facts with that source. This may vary with how TMG handles sources but that's perhaps the fault of TMG not adhering to the standard that was well established prior to the program being produced.

=== Non GEDCOM exports of TMG ===
The following options allow for some form of direct transfer of TMG files, possibly limited, apart from GEDCOM.

- tmg2gramps Converts TMG 6 datafiles to a GRAMPS v2.2.6 XML - by Anne Jessel.
- Forays Into Genealogy Data Base Modelling - Details how Leif Biberg Kristensen moved his data out of TMG into a program of his own creation .
- History Research Environment - This community project is creating a free and open source platform-independent application for the serious or professional historical researcher. It is designed to provide an onward path for genealogists who currently use the now-discontinued program The Master Genealogist (TMG).
- RootsMagic - RootsMagic can now directly import files from TMG 7.04, 8.08, or later.

=== File format ===
TMG's underlying database engine is Visual FoxPro v9 and does not support Unicode.

1. File Structures for (TMG) for v9 - Last updated July, 2014
2. TMG File Structure - Applicable to TMG v3.x, v4.x, v5.x, v6.x, v7.x

== Companion products ==
Several software developers have created companion products specifically for TMG that enhance its functionality. These products include:

- Second Site, advanced web publishing and data review application for TMG - by John Cardinal
- PathWiz!, TMG exhibit file management product - by BeeSoft
- GedStar Pro, for Android smartphones display application - by GHCS Software.
- GenSmarts, research advisor that analyzes users' genealogical data and offers suggestions

TMG data output is compatible with a range of geographical mapping and genealogical reporting applications that support the GEDCOM format.

Significant freeware and shareware utility applications, as well as independently published user guides and manuals, also support TMG's installed user base.
