= Leo van de Pas =

Dutch-Australian genealogist (1942 - 2016)

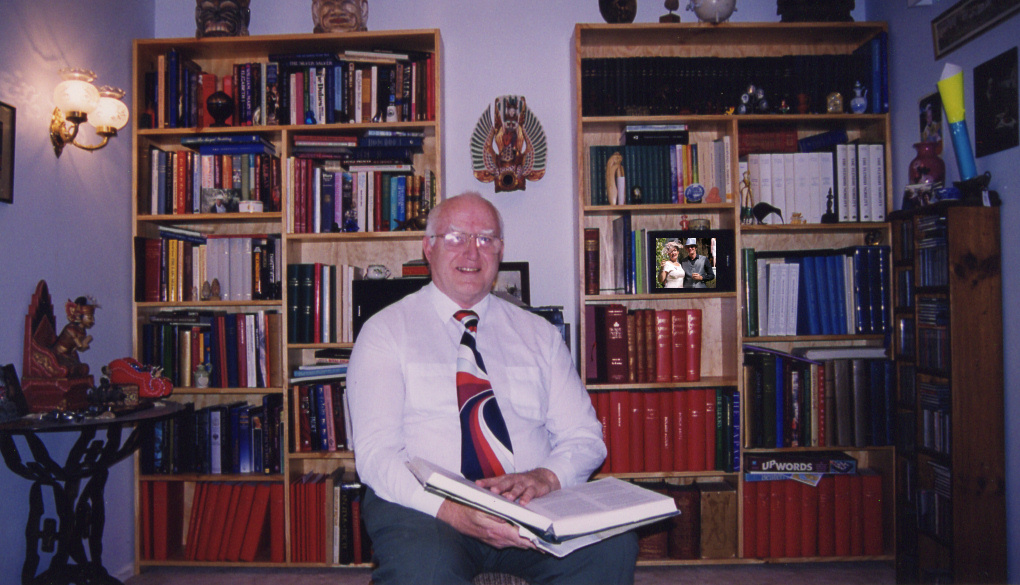
- Van de Pas in front of his genealogical collection
- Born: 28 October 1942; De Bilt, Netherlands
- Died: 17 August 2016 (aged 73); Canberra, Australia
- Occupation: Genealogist
- Notable work: www.genealogics.org website
- Parents: Willem van de Pas; Johanna Jacoba Cox

Leonardus Franciscus Maria van de Pas (28 October 1942 ‒ 17 August 2016), known as Leo van de Pas, was a Dutch and Australian historian and genealogist.

== Early life ==
Pas was born on 28 October 1942 in De Bilt, Netherlands to Wilhelmus Martinus (Willem) van de Pas (1901–1960) and Johanna Jacoba Cox (1909–1987). His father was a religious author and Pas grew up in a particularly religious household. After his father's death in 1960, he served in various religious and clerical positions, as well as undertaking his national service in New Guinea (1962). To explore a new life abroad, he immigrated to Australia in 1968, where he took a position as an administrative assistant to the Dutch-Australian author G. M. Glaskin in Perth, Western Australia. He later became a naturalized Australian citizen. As an additional source of income, he also worked for Ansett Airlines until his early retirement in 1994, which enabled him to devote more of his time to his abiding interest in genealogy. After Glaskin's death in 2000, he moved from Perth to Canberra to be closer to van de Pas family members.

== Genealogy ==
Once settled in Australia, Pas wrote, co-authored and contributed to numerous genealogy books and, later on, web articles. He wrote the forewords to other books. His knowledge of genealogy and international reputation enabled him to review and revise the draft work of Princess Michael of Kent, and Michel Roger Lafosse, the self-styled Prince Michael James Alexander Stewart, 7th Count of Albany. He also joined the internet newsgroup "soc.genealogy.medieval" (Gen. Med.) where he interacted with like-minded researchers and helped newcomers from his extensive home library.

== Genealogics ==
Genealogics
- Website type: Genealogical reference website
- Available in: English
- Creators: Leo van de Pas (1942-2016); Ian Fettes (1945-2025)
- Editor: Leslie Mahler, FASG
- Website: www.genealogics.org
- Commercial: Free to use
- Registration: Not required
- Launched: 2003
- Current status: Online
- Written in: TNG

Pas's interest in genealogy was matched by his early involvement in computer genealogy. He commissioned a bespoke DOS data entry program from Gary Louth, which turbo-charged his data entry rates. Collaborations with Colin and Rosie Bevan enabled him to extend his electronic holdings. A later collaboration with Brigitte Gastel Lloyd enabled him to start moving his data onto the World Wide Web. Later, in 2003, his collaboration with Ian Fettes (1945-2025) enabled him to develop and launch Genealogics, a substantial online reference website and database for medieval and other genealogy. This website is based on TNG software. Following the death of Ian Fettes, the website is nowadays managed by Leslie Mahler, FASG.

== Death and legacy ==
On 17 August 2016, Pas died in Canberra, Australia following a short convalescence.

While he never did establish an ancestral link between his own family history and any notable medieval family, he assisted numerous other people in achieving such connections. His Genealogics website continues to be one of the few free online reference databases covering the medieval and other periods. His correspondence with actress Audrey Hepburn provided first-hand public clarification of her early family history.

On 25 October 1988, he was invited by the Australian Prime Minister Bob Hawke to have lunch with the visiting Queen Beatrix of the Netherlands and her husband Prince Claus.

== Selected bibliography ==
=== Books ===
- L.F.M. van de Pas (1971). Monarchs and their families in the golden era of the western European dynasties : a genealogical collection. Cottesloe. OCLC 55706204.
- L.F.M. van de Pas (1973). Vroege vaderen des vaderlands afstammende van prins Willem I, de Zwijger, genaamd vader des vaderlands [Early Fathers of the Fatherland descending from Prince William I, the Silent, called Father of the Fatherland] (in Dutch). Zeist. OCLC 67038568.
- L.F.M. van de Pas (1975). H.R.H. Charles, Prince of Wales, his ancestors over seven generations. Cottesloe. OCLC 220481855.
- L.F.M. van de Pas (1976). Charles I, King of England and Scotland : his ancestors over seven generations. Cottesloe. OCLC 20517804.
- L.F.M. van de Pas (1976). Frederick Lewis, Prince of Wales : his ancestors over six generations. Cottesloe. OCLC 21912638.
- L.F.M. van de Pas (1988). An introduction to ancestors of Diana, Princess of Wales. Mosman Park. OCLC 43943339.
- L.F.M. van de Pas (1996). Introduction to the House of Londonderry. Mosman Park. OCLC 312402653.
- Leo van de Pas (1996). Introduction to descendants of Sir Gervase Clifton 1st Baronet (1587-1666). Mosman Park. OCLC 866770398.
- L.F.M. van de Pas (1997). Introduction to Ancestors of The Hon. Katharine Fraser, the Hon. Alice Ramsay, and the Hon. Elizabeth Ramsay. Mosman Park. OCLC 74811538.
- Leo van de Pas (1998). Ancestor list of Prince William of Wales. Mosman Park. OCLC 796839767.
- Leo van de Pas (1999). Crommelin: an introduction to descendants of a Huguenot family. Mosman Park. OCLC 796841089.
- Leo van de Pas (1999). Royal ancestor: an introduction to eight generations of descendants of King Edward III. Mosman Park. OCLC 45133531.
- Brigitte Gastel Lloyd & Leo van de Pas (1998). Father of Europe: Introduction to descendants of William "The Silent", Prince of Orange, 1533-1584. L. F. M. Van De Pas. ASIN B004AX9UV8. OCLC 866770326.
- Leo van de Pas (2000). Introduction to ancestors of Georgiana McCrae. Mosman Park. OCLC 866770256.
- Leo van de Pas (2000). Ancestors (of Valery Giscard d'Estaing). Mosman Park. OCLC 796839769.
- Leo van de Pas (2000). A small introduction to ancestors of Prince Charles Edward Stuart. Mosman Park. OCLC 796839770.
- Leo van de Pas (2000). Alba: an Introduction to the Dukes of Alba De Tormes. ASIN B004AX6QGA. OCLC 45157408.
- Leo van de Pas (2005). Sinners and Saints: A Biographical Introduction to the Ancestors of HRH Princess Michael of Kent. L. van de Pas. ISBN 978-0646450070. OCLC 224418513.
- Ian Fettes & Leo van de Pas (2007). Plantagenet cousins: selected descendants of Geoffrey V, Count of Anjou in Australia, America, Africa, Europe and Asia. I. Fettes and L. van de Pas. ISBN 9780646470184. OCLC 166313431.
- Leo van de Pas (2011). "Portraits of Ancestors". OCLC 741501604.

== See also ==
- Wikidata Property 1819
