= Ancestral Quest =

- Ancestral Quest Basics v14.00.8 in Windows 8
- Original authors: Gaylon Findlay, Ben Buckwalter
- Developers: Incline Software, LC
- Release: 1994; 32 years ago
- Stable release: v16 Build 8 / 23 September 2020; 5 years ago
- Operating system: Windows 2000 and later
- Size: 19 MB
- Available in: 16 languages
- List of languages Chinese, Danish, English, Finnish, French, German, Hungarian, Japanese, Korean, Norwegian, Polish, Portuguese, Russian, Spanish, Swedish, Turkish
- Type: Genealogy software
- License: Proprietary software
- Website: www.ancquest.com

Ancestral Quest (AQ) is a genealogy software application for Microsoft Windows developed by Incline Software, LC. It features data entry with sourcing capabilities and scrapbook extensions; a print engine for standard or custom charts and reports; a web page creator; a collaboration engine; and an extension tool for other genealogy databases.

Ancestral Quest was the first desktop genealogy software program to be certified to access, update, and synchronize with newer versions of FamilySearch.

== Languages ==
Developed in English, Ancestral Quest allows for translation to other languages using language modules. These user-created files allow Ancestral Quest screens and reports to be translated or customized. A user can create his or her own language module, or leverage the module of someone else. The Danish, French, German, Norwegian, and Spanish language modules are completely translated. The Chinese, Finnish, and Swedish language modules currently have all basic screens and reports translated.

== Features ==
- Creates a family tree, documenting sources and adding scrapbook items
- Researches the Internet with search engine interfaces
- Prints standard and custom charts, reports or books
- Creates web pages
- Imports and exports GEDCOM files
- Extends the use of other databases, such as Personal Ancestral File or FamilySearch
- Can be used on a flash drive
- Collaborate with other researchers, using a single master database
- Can convert Personal Ancestral File (PAF) files

== History ==
=== Version history ===
- Ancestral Quest 1.0: 1994
- Ancestral Quest 1.1: 1995
- Ancestral Quest 2.0: 1996
- Ancestral Quest 2.1: 1997
- Ancestral Quest 3.0: 1999
- Ancestral Quest 10.0: 2002 - collaboration, research manager, global find/replace, PAF5.x support, fan charts, enhanced reporting
- Ancestral Quest 11.0: 2003 - memorize source citations, detailed change log, print to PDF, drop line charts, online IGI lookups
- Ancestral Quest 12.0: 2007 - individual summary screen, language translation, UNICODE
- Ancestral Quest 12.1: 2008 - link and sync with new FamilySearch, flash drive support
- Ancestral Quest 12.1: 2010 - Build 23 - Switched to FamilyTree API Version 2 for nFS, display age at marriage/death on family view, added ghost lines between children on family view, minor bug fixes
- Ancestral Quest 12.1: 2010 - Build 26 - Allows use of external viewer for photos, Improved Check/Repair, Assorted Bug Fixes
- Ancestral Quest 14.0: 2012 - Research Timeline, Color Coding, Tags, improvements to fan charts, FamilySearch Family Tree, LDS features
- Ancestral Quest 14.0: 2015 - Mac Version available 19 August 2015
- Ancestral Quest 15.0: 2016
- Ancestral Quest 16.0: 2019

=== AQ technology in other products ===
In 1998, AQ was licensed for resale through Individual Software, and has been sold by them under the names of "Family Ties", "Family Trees Quick & Easy", "Heritage Family Tree Deluxe", and "Family Tree Heritage". In 1999, the AQ code was licensed to the LDS Church and became the base of the Windows versions of Personal Ancestral File. Millions of copies of PAF have been distributed. In 2001, the AQ code was licensed to Ancestry.com, and became the base of Ancestry Family Tree. Nearly a million copies of AFT were distributed.

=== Company history ===
In 1998, Incline Software merged with The Hope Foundation. In 2001, this merger ended and Incline Software again became the custodian of AQ.
