= MacFamilyTree =

Genealogy software

- MacFamilyTree running on macOS
- Developer: Synium Software GmbH
- Release: August 10, 1998; 28 years ago
- Stable release: 11.0 / January 28, 2025; 18 months ago
- Operating system: macOS Monterey or later, iOS 16 or later
- Platform: macOS, iOS
- Available in: English; Czech; Danish; Dutch; Finnish; French; German; Hungarian; Italian; Norwegian Bokmål; Polish; Portuguese; Russian; Spanish; Swedish
- Type: Genealogy Software
- License: Proprietary software
- Website: www.syniumsoftware.com/macfamilytree

MacFamilyTree is a commercial genealogy program for macOS, which allows users to build family trees and document genealogical research by adding data, including pictures, documents, and sound clips. It uses iCloud to synchronize across devices and can generate and publish HTML web pages from saved family trees.

Data visualization methods include a classic descendant chart, timelines, and a virtual globe showing locations of key events in the lives of subjects. Reports can be generated for individual entries or entire families.

MobileFamilyTree is a mobile application for iPad, iPhone and iPod Touch, with near-identical features, optionally allowing synchronisation with MacFamilyTree using iCloud.

While internally it uses the Core Data API to store and modify information, it imports and exports GEDCOM files for compatibility with other genealogical tools.
