= Kenneth Hess =

American businessman, engineer and writer

- Kenneth L. Hess, engineer, author, entrepreneur, and philanthropist, at the Golden State Star Party, northeastern California, 2009.
- Born: Kenneth Lafferty Hess; January 22, 1953 (age 73); Warren, Ohio, USA
- Education: Stanford; Harvard
- Occupations: Science Buddies Founder and President

Kenneth Lafferty Hess (born January 22, 1953) is an engineer, author, entrepreneur, and philanthropist. Hess is the founder and president of Science Buddies, a non-profit organization dedicated to furthering science literacy through the creation of free resources and services for K-12 students, teachers, and families. He holds one of the first software patents ever granted and has designed and/or developed dozens of commercial software, content, and Internet products, including Family Tree Maker, one of the all-time best-selling home software programs. Among his awards are a PC Magazine Editor's Choice, PC Magazine Top 100 Web Site, a Codie award and a Science Prize for Online Resources in Education (SPORE).

== Science Buddies ==
As a ninth-grader, Hess' science fair project involved using a dentist's X-ray machine to test a cloud chamber he had built. Hess was interested in observing the trails of the radioactive particles as they moved through the chamber. Later, as a parent, Hess observed his daughter's success and enjoyment of the science fair process.

At the same time, he recognized that many students lack the resources and support they need to get the maximum educational benefit from a science fair project. With a goal of supporting students from all walks of life (as well as their teachers, parents, and schools) in doing science research projects, Hess founded Science Buddies in 2001 under the umbrella of the Kenneth Lafferty Hess Family Charitable Foundation. (The organization formalized its name change to Science Buddies in 2010.)

Since the inception of Science Buddies, Hess has led the organization in creating an innovative library of resources designed to enrich and support science education. These resources include 1000+ scientist-vetted project ideas in more than 30 scientific fields, a Topic Selection Wizard to help students find exciting and appropriate science and engineering projects, tools and materials for classroom use, guides to help science-fair administrators, and a complete project guide to help students with all steps of conducting a science or engineering project. During 2010, 9.8 million unique individuals visited the Science Buddies website, a number equal to ~18% of U.S. students in grades K–12.

As a testament to the quality of resources Hess has implemented and developed at Science Buddies to meet the needs of K-12 educators and to help bridge the gap between researchers and K-12 students, Science Buddies was awarded the prestigious Science Prize for Online Resources in Education (SPORE) in April 2011. SPORE awards are given by Science and the American Association for the Advancement of Science (AAAS).

== Career ==
Prior to launching his first company, Hess worked at Intel Corporation, Teradyne, Hewlett-Packard, and Symantec. He founded Banner Blue Software in 1984. Tapping into a growing societal interest in genealogy and personal ancestry, Banner Blue developed Family Tree Maker, genealogy software that enabled users to locate and organize ancestral information. During the first half of 1996, Family Tree Maker was one of three top-selling personal productivity product lines, according to PC Data. Banner Blue also developed Org Plus, a tool for creating corporate organization charts. A version of Org Plus, labeled Microsoft Organization Chart, was bundled into copies of Microsoft Office for many years. Hess wrote the initial versions of both Family Tree Maker and Org Plus and designed the initial version of Family Tree Maker Online.

Hess' success with Banner Blue Software was an exercise in "bootstrapping." Starting the company with a personal investment of $20,000, Hess bootstrapped Banner Blue Software into a company with 100 employees and annual sales of $25 million (and approximately 2 million copies of Family Tree Maker sold) when Broderbund Software, Inc. acquired it in 1995. Hess outlined the success of Banner Blue and his "bootstrapping" approach in Bootstrap: Lessons Learned Building a Successful Company from Scratch.

In 1999, Hess co-founded Pocket Express, a company that designed and manufactured software for Palm pocket computers. Pocket Express' product line was sold to Handmark, Inc. in 2002.

=== Suborbital spaceflight on New Shepard ===
In 2024, Hess was selected in a suborbital spacefight to fly as a space tourist on Blue Origin's New Shepard NS-25 in April 2024. The other passengers are Mason Angel, Sylvain Chiron, Carol Schaller, Gopichand Thotakura and Ed Dwight, a former US Air Force Captain.

== Boards and advisory committees ==
- Chairman of California State Summer School for Mathematics and Science (COSMOS) Advisory Board
- Sensant Corporation, San Leandro, CA, 1998-2005 (Sensant was acquired by Siemens in 2005)
- Carmel Bach Festival, Carmel, CA, 2001–2004
- The Hoover Institution, Stanford University, Board of Overseers, 1996–2002
- Software Forum Advisory Board, 1993–1998

== Publications and patents ==
- Science Buddies: Advancing Informal Science Education Science 29 April 2011: Vol. 332 no. 6029 pp. 550–551, doi:10.1126/science.1196978
- Science Buddies: Advancing Informal Science Education on YouTube (video, 2011)
- Bootstrap: Lessons Learned Building A Successful Company From Scratch, S-Curve Press, 2001.
- Remarks to Software Forum Dinner Meeting, 1997.
- U.S. Patent 4,764,867, "Display System and Method for Constructing and Editing a Hierarchical Arrangement of Information," issued August 1988.
- "Picking the Best Display: An Easy-to-Follow Guide." Electronic Design (August 19, 1982): 139-146-1215

== Early life and education ==
Hess was born in Warren, Ohio, to Phyllis Lafferty Hess and Richard Morton Hess. After graduating from Howland High School in 1971, Hess attended Stanford University where he earned a BS in engineering. His course of study was interdisciplinary with emphasis in engineering, computer science, and political science. Following Stanford, Hess received an MBA from Harvard.

== Family and hobbies ==
Hess and his wife, Constance, have one daughter, Amber. Hess' personal interests include photography and astronomy. Combining his interest in photography, astro-photography, and science literacy, Hess has authored the following Science Buddies resources and materials:

- Camera Lens Testing
- The Golden State Star Party, Science Buddies Blog
- The Golden State Star Party - II, Science Buddies Blog
- The Golden State Star Party - III, Science Buddies Blog
