= Harmony (software company) =

American artificial intelligence company

- Type: Private
- Industry: Enterprise software; Artificial intelligence; Natural language understanding
- Founded: 2025; 1 year ago
- Headquarters: New York City, New York, U.S.
- Key people: Nitzan Shapira (CEO); Ran Ribenzaft (CTO); Menni Alashvili (VP of R&D); Omer Zucker (VP of Product); Gadi BenMark (CMO)
- Number of employees: 60
- Website: harmony.io

Harmony IT Inc is an American AI company headquartered in New York. It provides internal enterprise services by deploying AI agents embedded in workplace platforms to deliver personalized employee support.

== History ==
Harmony was founded in May 2025, by Nitzan Shapira and Ran Ribenzaft, (who had sold their first startup Epsagon to Cisco for $500 million in 2021).

In July 2026, the company raised $34 million in seed funding, led by Lightspeed Venture Partners, with participation from Hitachi Ventures, Fin Capital, Mercer Ventures, Operator Partners, and angel investors including Wiz founder Assaf Rappaport.

The company's headquarters are in New York, United States, and its research and development center is located in Tel Aviv, Israel. Harmony's reported customers include n8n, eToro, Cyera, and KITH.

== Product and technology ==
Harmony's platform connects with existing enterprise software and uses organizational context (employee roles, application permissions, work history, company policies, etc.) to deliver personalized responses and automate routine tasks, by deploying over 100 prebuilt AI agents.

The company's system operates inside platforms such as Slack and Microsoft Teams to handle tasks, from answering policy questions, software access provision, assisting with onboarding, process approvals, and performing administrative functions which traditionally required support teams to manually respond to requests. Harmony's embedded AI works directly inside the workplace collaboration tools and facilitates sectors including IT, HR, finance, legal, security, and more.
