= GEDitCOM =

GEDitCOM II
- Original author(s): John A Nairn
- Developer(s): RSAC Software
- Initial release: 7 December 1998; 26 years ago
- Stable release: 2.3 / 17 November 2016; 8 years ago
- Operating system: Mac OS X (10.4 or higher)
- Available in: Multilingual (6)
- Type: Genealogy software
- License: Proprietary
- Website: geditcom.com

GEDitCOM is a genealogy application for Mac OS X that provides methods to input, manipulate, and view information about a family history. It includes options for users to produce charts depicting family relationships and web pages for publishing family history online.

GEDitCOM has native support of GEDCOM files, and is customizable and extensible through Applescript, Python, or Ruby.

== Version history ==
=== GEDitCOM II ===
GEDitCOM II v1.0 was released 7 June 2009 and was a complete rewrite of GEDitCOM 3.82 as a universal binary Cocoa-based application, which runs under OS X 10.4 and higher.

=== GEDitCOM (Classic) ===
GEDitCOM v1.0 was released 7 December 1998, with the final version 3.82, released on 7 June 2009 which runs on MacOS 8 and 9.

=== GEDitCOM Version 2.0 ===
The most significant changes were the introduction of "Extensions" (or GEDitCOM II plugins), dynamic editing in trees, and redesigned help window.

== Supported languages ==
English, French, Spanish, Portuguese, Finnish, Swedish.
