= Geneanet =

Online genealogy website

- Company type: Private
- Headquarters: Paris, France
- Owner: Ancestry.com (since 2021)
- Founder: Jacques Le Marois (CEO)
- Industry: Internet
- Products: Family history website Genealogy software Mobile application
- Employees: 32
- Website: www.geneanet.org
- Launched: 1996; 30 years ago
- Current status: Active

Geneanet (previously stylized as GeneaNet) is a Paris-based genealogy website with 4 million members. Since 2021 it is a subsidiary of Ancestry, the largest genealogy company in the world. Its website consists of data added by registered participants and is available for free to any interested people. An optional annual subscription provides additional search options and additional records.

== History ==
In December 1996, Jacques Le Marois, Jérôme Abela, and Julien Cassaigne launched a website for "using the strength of the Internet to build a database indexing all the genealogical resources existing in the world, available or not online". The former name was "LPF" (List of surnames of France).

The purpose of the site is, through the family trees shared by the members, to match hundreds of thousands of records and genealogical data, to maximize the opportunities of finding common ancestors and growing the family trees. A search in this index can tell if a surname has been investigated by a genealogist (mostly amateur) in a certain place and a certain period of time. Over the years, Geneanet has developed new tools: an internal mailbox, some charts and lists print tools, a digitized library... The number of unique visitors par month has increased from 330,000 in 2006 to more than 1 million in 2018. In 2019, Geneanet has more than 2 million unique visitors per month and is called "heavyweight of the sector".

In August 2012, the Geneanet database reached the milestone of 1 billion entries, then 2 billion in August 2015, and 6 billion in 2019.

In September 2014, Geneanet launched a project for indexing soldiers in the First World War. At that time, the site was hosting more than 530,000 family trees with 800 million individuals.

Since 2015, Geneanet has participated in the genealogical exhibition which held in the town hall of the 15th arrondissement of Paris

In 2017, Geneanet signed a partnership with FamilySearch, allowing the LDS members to have a free Geneanet Premium subscription.

In 2018, Geneanet took part in the debate about DNA tests for genealogical purpose. Since then, the site conducts surveys with its members (20,000 en 2018).

On June 28, 2018, the CEO of Geneanet, Jacques Le Marois, was present at the Filae General Assembly, its main competitor, because the Trudaine Participations company (which more than 30% of the capital is held by Geneanet) has acquired 25% of the capital of Filae.

On August 31, 2021, Ancestry announced that it had acquired Geneanet. Geneanet explained for French genealogy magazine La Revue française de Généalogie that the acquisition was the consequence of Geneanet's failure to acquire French competitor Filae, which instead had been sold to MyHeritage a month earlier. The Geneanet management promised that the Geneanet.org site would remain autonomous, but indicated that the sale meant that its Premium subscribers would get access to many of the Ancestry databases.

== Description ==
Geneanet has 3 million members, 800,000 family trees and 6 billion indexed individuals as of March 2019. The site proposes three levels of use (visitor, registered and Premium): the second level allows the user to create a family tree, and the third level is a paid service which allows the user access to collections added by genealogy societies among other things.

Geneanet is a contributive, collaborative and freemium website. The site allows users to create a family tree with an unlimited number of individuals for free. A paid subscription allows members to more easily find information, to receive email alerts when new matches are available, to access a genealogy library with 3 billion indexed individuals, and to match their family tree to the database.

== Features ==
The site Geneanet, based on GeneWeb, allows to calculate and display relationships between two persons in a family tree, and to highlight possible blood relationships. Some relationships between famous people have been relayed by the press.

Since December 2015, Geneanet allows all the users to search the database through an advanced search engine which can perform queries by first name and last name, option which was reserved for paid members. In September 2017, Geneanet has launched a new matching option for finding common persons between the family trees of the members.

Since 2018, Geneanet proposes a service to automatically create and print a family book from a family tree, through a partnership with the site Patronomia.

=== Geneanet DNA ===
On February 17, 2020, Geneanet launched "Geneanet DNA", a service which allow users who have taken a DNA test to upload their DNA data and to find new relatives for free. Geneanet DNA features were discontinued on December 20, 2023.

== Other sites and projects ==
Geneanet has launched some other genealogy websites:

- GeneaStar, for finding relationships with famous people.

Geneanet has also launched some mobile apps:

- GeneaGraves: members are invited to take pictures of graves and cemeteries.
- Now and Then: launched in 2015 with the purpose of taking pictures of present-day scenes and superimposing them to old postcards.

== See also ==
- FamilySearch
