= Family Tree Maker =

Genealogy software

- Original author: Kenneth Lafferty Hess
- Developer: Software MacKiev
- Release: 1989; 37 years ago
- Stable release: 2019 (Version 24.2) (February 2023; 3 years ago)
- Operating system: Windows, Mac OS X
- Available in: English
- Type: Genealogy software
- License: Proprietary
- Website: familytreemaker.com

Family Tree Maker is genealogy software for Windows and Mac that allows the researcher to keep track of information collected during research and to create reports, charts, and books containing that information. The software was originally developed by Kenneth Hess of Banner Blue Software, which was purchased by Broderbund in 1995. It passed through the hands of The Learning Company, SoftKey, Mattel, and others before coming under its current ownership. A redesigned Family Tree Maker 2008 was released on August 14, 2007. The 2009 version of the program corrected some of the errors and omissions of its predecessor, and introduced a few new features. Family Tree Maker 2010 claimed to further enhance the radical redesign and be more powerful and feature-packed with faster navigation and quicker load times.

A version for the Mac was released in 1997; due to low market demand, for over a decade it was discontinued. A new version of Family Tree Maker for Mac was released on November 4, 2010. Family Tree Maker Version 16 was awarded a Codie award in the "Best Consumer Productivity Solution" category in 2006. On December 8, 2015, Ancestry.com announced that it would discontinue Family Tree Maker. The announcement was met by fierce protest from Family Tree Maker users. On February 2, 2016, Ancestry.com announced that Software MacKiev, the company that had developed the Mac version of the software for more than six years, would acquire the Family Tree Maker brand, and take over the development and publishing of Mac and Windows editions.

The core functionality and user interface of Family Tree Maker 2017 have changed little since 2010. Software MacKiev touted four major improvements: FamilySearch integration, FamilySync, Color Coding, and Photo Darkroom. FamilySearch integration provides potential matches to the FamilySearch.org Family Tree, and their record collections. FamilySync is a replacement for Ancestry.com's TreeSync feature; it provides potential matches to family trees, indexes, and records at Ancestry.com. It was necessitated by Ancestry.com retiring their TreeSync application programming interface (API). While the old API was used exclusively by Ancestry.com, since they also owned Family Tree Maker, the new API is open to other software developers to use. Color Coding allows users to assign up to four different colors to a person and their ancestors. Photo Darkroom can darken faded black and white photos.

== FTM version history ==
	Meaning
Red	Not supported
Yellow	Still supported (update to the last patch for that version)
Green	Current version

Version	Release date	Released by	Edition/s	Notes
1.0	1989	Banner Blue Software	MS-DOS	Supplied on 3.5 and 5.25 floppy disks. Data file used .FTM as a file extension. No GEDCOM support.
1.01	1990	Banner Blue Software	MS-DOS	No GEDCOM support.
2.0	January 1994	Banner Blue Software	Windows 3.1 / MS-DOS	Data file used .FTW as a file extension on Windows. Supplied on two 3½ inch floppy disks. Supported GEDCOM import/export.
2.??	October 1994	Banner Blue Software	Windows 3.1 / DOS	Second version (patch?)
3.0	24 October 1995	Broderbund Software	Windows 3.1 and 95 (16-bit) / MS-DOS	Supplied on three floppy disks. 16 bit application compatible with Windows 95. DOS version shipped with the DEU (Data Exchange Utility)
3.01	February 1996	Broderbund Software	Windows 3.1 and 95 (16 bit and 32 bit) / MS-DOS	Beginning with this version every copy of Family Tree Maker for Windows came with both a Windows 95 (32-bit) and Windows 3.1x (16-bit) version.
3.02	October 1995	Broderbund Software	Windows 32 bit	
3.02 Mac	January 1997	Broderbund Software	Macintosh (PowerPC processor only)	Marketed as Family Tree Maker Deluxe Edition II for Macintosh.
3.4	November 1996	Broderbund Software	Windows 3.1 and 95 (16-bit and 32-bit) / MS-DOS	
4.0	September 1996	Broderbund Software	Windows 3.1 and 95 (16-bit and 32-bit) / MS-DOS	First release on a CD-ROM.
4.0a	?	Broderbund Software	Windows	
4.0b	?	Broderbund Software	Windows	
4.4	?	Broderbund Software	Windows	
4.4 File Fixer Patch	?	Broderbund Software	Windows	
5.0	(before) August 1998	The Learning Company	Windows	
5.0a (Patch)	?	The Learning Company	Windows	
5.0b	?	The Learning Company	Windows	
6.0	after May 1999	The Learning Company (Mattel Incorporated)	Windows	
6.0a (Index Optimization Update)	?	The Learning Company (Mattel Incorporated)	Windows	
7.0	October 1999	The Learning Company (Mattel Incorporated)	Windows	
7.5	April 2000	Genealogy.com	Windows	
8.0	October 2000	Genealogy.com	Windows	
9.0	October 2001	Genealogy.com	Windows	
9.0 (patch after release)	October 30, 2001	Genealogy.com	Windows	
10.0	September 2002	Genealogy.com	Windows	
11.0	September 2003	MyFamily.com	Windows	
2005	August 2004	MyFamily.com	Windows	
2006	12 September 2005	MyFamily.com	Windows	
2006 Patch	?	MyFamily.com	Windows	
16	September 2006	MyFamily.com	Windows	
2008	14 August 2007	Ancestry.com	Windows	Returned to using the .FTM extension for windows datafiles.
2008 Service Pack 1	?	Ancestry.com	Windows	
2008 Service Pack 2	November 2007	Ancestry.com	Windows	An initial release was in September but this was withdrawn 24 hours later.
2008 Service Pack 3 (17.0.0.965)	May 2008	Ancestry.com	Windows	
2009	28 August 2008	The Generations Network	Windows	
2009 Patch 18A (18.0.0.94)	?	The Generations Network	Windows	
2009 Patch 18B (18.0.0.95)	?	The Generations Network	Windows	
2009 Patch 18C (18.0.0.305)	?	The Generations Network	Windows	
2009 Patch 18D (18.0.0.307)	?	The Generations Network	Windows	
2010	19 August 2009	Ancestry.com	Windows Vista and XP SP2	
2010 Service Pack 1 (19.0.0.206)	?	Ancestry.com	Windows 7, Vista, and XP SP2	
2011	31 August 2010	Ancestry.com	Windows 7, Vista, and XP SP2	
2011 Service Pack 1 (20.0.0.376)	?	Ancestry.com	Windows 7, Vista, and XP SP2	
2010 Mac	4 November 2010	Ancestry.com	Mac OSX 10.5 or later (Intel-based Mac)	Marketed as Family Tree Maker for Mac. Supplied on 2 × CD-ROM
2010 Mac (Update 19.2.0.241)	1 February 2011	Ancestry.com	Mac OSX 10.5 or later (Intel-based Mac)	
2012	29 September 2011	Ancestry.com	Windows 7, Vista, and XP SP2	
World Express	2013	Ancestry.com	Windows 7, Vista, and XP SP2	With restricted functionality, only in German and Swedish
2014	10 September 2013	Ancestry.com	Windows 7, Vista, and XP SP2	
2014 Mac	13 December 2013	Ancestry.com	Mac OSX 10.6 or later (Intel-based Mac)	Marketed as Family Tree Maker Mac 3.
FTM 2014.1	1 January 2017	mackiev.com	Windows 7 or later, including Windows 10	
FTM Mac 3.1	1 January 2017	mackiev.com	Mac OSX 10.8 or later, including macOS Sierra 10.12	
FTM 2017 (Version 23.0)	16 July 2017	mackiev.com	Windows 7 or later, including Windows 10 + Mac OSX 10.9 or later, including macOS Sierra 10.13	
FTM 2017 (Version 23.1)	February 2018	mackiev.com	Windows 7 or later, including Windows 10 + Mac OSX 10.9 or later, including macOS Sierra 10.13	
FTM 2017 (Version 23.2)	September 2018	mackiev.com	Windows 7 or later, including Windows 10 + Mac OSX 10.9 or later, including macOS Sierra 10.13	
FTM 2017 (Version 23.3)	December 2019	mackiev.com	Windows 7 or later, including Windows 10 + Mac OSX 10.9 or later, including macOS Catalina 10.15	
FTM 2019 (Version 24.0)	28 September 2019	mackiev.com	Windows 7 or later, including Windows 10 + OS X 10.10 or later, including macOS Catalina 10.15	
FTM 2019 (Version 24.0.1)	November 2019	mackiev.com	Windows 7 or later, including Windows 10 + OS X 10.10 or later, including macOS Catalina 10.15	
FTM 2019 (Version 24.1)	August 2022	mackiev.com	Windows 7 or later, including Windows 10 + OS X 10.10 or later, including macOS Catalina 10.15	
FTM 2019 (Version 24.2)	February 2023	mackiev.com	Windows 7 or later, including Windows 10 + OS X 10.10 or later, including macOS Catalina 10.15	
FTM 2019 (Version 24.2.2)	November 2023	mackiev.com	Windows 7 or later, including Windows 10 + OS X 10.10 or later, including macOS Catalina 10.15	
FTM 2024 (Version 25.0)	May 2025	mackiev.com	Windows 10 (x64) or later, including Windows 11 + macOS Big Sur (11) or later, including macOS Sequoia (15.0)	

=== FTM merger history ===
- 1984 Banner Blue Software founded by Ken Hess, "As the founder and president of Banner Blue Software from 1984 to 1996, I sold over two million copies of Family Tree Maker."
- May 1997 Broderbund Software acquired Parsons Technology from Intuit (which included the marketing rights to Family Origins for Windows
- August 1998 Broderbund Software acquired by The Learning Company (which included Family Tree Creator through an acquisition of Mindscape/IMSI. v5 Published
- Late 1998 The Learning Company acquired Palladium Interactive (which included Ultimate Family Tree).
- May 1999 The Learning Company was acquired by Mattel Incorporated "Barbie").v6 Published
- November 1999 A&E Television Networks, Hearst Interactive Media, Mattel, and private equity firms form Genealogy.com, LLC April 2000 v7.5 Published.
- February 2001 A&E TV acquired Genealogy.com
- Late 2001 Genealogy.com acquired the GenForum message board site, which it had been hosting for a few years
- June 2002 Genealogy.com acquired Generations PC product line from Sierra Home
- April 2003 Genealogy.com acquired by MyFamily.com
- December 2006 My Family.com Inc changed its name to The Generations Network
- March 2016 Software MacKiev purchased FTM Software from ancestry.com
