= Personal Ancestral File =

Genealogy software

- Developer: FamilySearch
- Initial release: 1983; 43 years ago
- Final release: 2002 (version 5.2.18.0), support discontinued July 15, 2013; 12 years ago
- Operating system: Windows, Mac
- Type: Genealogy software
- License: Freeware

Personal Ancestral File (PAF) was a free genealogy software program provided by FamilySearch, a website operated by the Church of Jesus Christ of Latter-day Saints. It was first released in 1983, last updated in 2002, and formally discontinued in 2013. It allowed users to enter names, dates, citations and source information into a database, and sort and search the genealogical data, print forms and charts, and share files with others in GEDCOM format. PAF also linked images and other media files to individual records.

== History ==
The history of PAF ran in parallel with the evolution of GEDCOM, the de facto specification for GEnealogy Data COMmunication or exchange.

Version 2.3.1, released in 1994, was the last version written specifically for the Macintosh operating system, though PAF 5.2.18, written for Windows, can be installed on Apple Mac OS X using CrossOver Mac.

In 2004 there were speculations about PAF being made open-source.

Version 5.2.18.0 began with an adaptation of Incline Software's Ancestral Quest program, written by Gaylon Findlay. Findlay has been involved in updates of PAF. Ancestral Quest has been developed separately, although it retains much of the basic visual layout and file structure of PAF.

In June 2013, FamilySearch announced that from July 15, 2013, PAF would be discontinued, and that support and downloads would no longer be available.

== Releases (1984–2002) ==
The following is a selected release history:

- PAF 1.0 (MS-DOS) released in April 1984. Written in BASIC and did not have support for GEDCOM.
- PAF 2.0 (MS-DOS, Apple II, CP/M) released in April 1986. Supported an early specification of GEDCOM 2.0. Due to PAF's slowness in BASIC, it was rewritten in C.
- PAF 2.1 (DOS, ProDOS, Macintosh) released in 1987. Supported an early specification of GEDCOM 4.0.
- PAF 2.2 (MS-DOS, ProDOS, Mac) released in 1989. Supported an early specification of GEDCOM 4.0.
- PAF 2.3 (MS-DOS, Macintosh) released in 1994. The Macintosh version was called PAF:Family Records and MacPAF. Supported an early specification of GEDCOM 4.0.
- PAF 2.31 (MS-DOS, Macintosh) released 30 Sep 1994. This was the final release of the Macintosh version and only worked on Classic OS - OS 8.5 through OS 9.2.2. Supported an early specification of GEDCOM 4.0.
- PAF 3.0 (DOS) released May 1997. Supports the current GEDCOM 5.5 specification.
- PAF 3.0M (DOS) released June 1999. A maintenance release of PAF 3.0; Shows as Release 3.01M.
- PAF 4.0 released 28 June 1999. (Win9x/NT) Freeware. Supports the current GEDCOM 5.5 specification. PAF 4.0 was based on Ancestral Quest.
- PAF 5.0 released in November 2000 (Win9x/NT) Freeware. Supports the current GEDCOM 5.5 specification. First version to support Unicode allowing multiple languages. Included was a standalone read-only Palm OS application to view, but not edit, PAF data.
- PAF 5.1 released in 2001 (Win9x/NT) Freeware. Supports the current GEDCOM 5.5 specification. Support multiple languages.
- PAF 5.2 released 23 July 2002 (Win9x/NT) Freeware. Supports the current GEDCOM 5.5 specification. Supports multiple languages.

== Multilingual support ==
- PAF 4.x supported English, Spanish, Portuguese, German and French; PAF 4.0.4 was the last version for French, Spanish, and Portuguese
- PAF 5.x supported English, Chinese, German, Japanese, Korean, and Swedish

== See also ==
- International Genealogical Index
- Numerical variation in kinship terms
