= PGV =

PGV may refer to:

- Peak Ground Velocity in seismology
- Pitt–Greenville Airport
- PhpGedView, web-based genealogy software
- Puna Geothermal Venture
