= Science Buddies =

Science Buddies
- Type: 501c3 public charity
- Founded: 2001
- Staff: Ken Hess, Founder and President
- Headquarters: Milpitas, California
- Members: 12 million K-12 student and teacher visitors
- Website: www.sciencebuddies.org

Science Buddies, formerly the Kenneth Lafferty Hess Family Charitable Foundation, is a non-profit organization that provides a website of free science project productivity tools and mentoring to support K-12 students, especially for science fairs. Founded in 2001 by engineer and high-tech businessman, Kenneth Hess, Science Buddies features STEM content and services to assist students and educators. Since its founding, it has expanded its original mission to provide teacher resources targeted for classroom and science fair use.

== Philosophy ==
Science Buddies mission is to help students to build their literacy in science and technology so they can become productive and engaged citizens in the 21st century.

The site has personalized learning tools, over 15,000 pages of scientist-developed subject matter (including experiments based on the latest academic research), and an online community of science professionals who volunteer to advise students.

Science Buddies also provides resources to support parents and teachers as they guide students seeking out and performing science projects. They attempt to provide a bridge between scientists, engineers, educators, and students, giving students access to current scientific research and simultaneously giving scientists a way to reach out to young people interested in their fields.

== About Science Buddies ==
Noticing how much fun his teenage daughter had participating in science fairs, but dismayed to discover a shortage of quality science fair help online, Ken Hess thought science fair "productivity tools" and mentoring would allow many more students to participate in science fairs and develop inspirational relationships with science role models. Over time, such a program would help students improve their science skills and literacy while inspiring them to consider careers in science and engineering. So, in early 2001, Ken Hess started a charity with a mission of developing online tools and support for students doing science fair projects.

In collaboration with high tech companies, government labs and agencies (like NOAA and NASA), universities, and other science education resources, Science Buddies offers scientist-authored tools, tips, and techniques. Doug Osheroff, (Nobel Prize winning physicist), and Bernard Harris (retired NASA astronaut) both serve on the Science Buddies scientific advisory board.

Science Buddies is a website, recommended by educational organizations such as the ALA and the SciLinks program of the National Science Teachers Association (NSTA). All resources and tools on the Science Buddies website are available free to students and teachers. Science Buddies uses an underwriting model of sponsorship (similar to PBS television) by displaying sponsor information.
