= GeneWeb =

Genealogy software

- Developer: Daniel de Rauglaudre
- Release: 1998; 28 years ago
- Stable release: 7.0.0 / 30 October 2020
- Written in: OCaml
- Operating system: Unix, Linux, Microsoft Windows and Mac OS X.
- Type: Genealogy software
- License: GPL-2.0-or-later
- Website: www.geneweb.org
- Repository: github.com/geneweb/geneweb

GeneWeb is a free multi-platform genealogy software tool created and owned by Daniel de Rauglaudre of INRIA. GeneWeb is accessed by a Web browser, either off-line or as a server in a Web environment. It uses very efficient techniques of relationship and consanguinity computing, developed in collaboration with Didier Rémy, research director at INRIA. GeneWeb is used as the engine for several public genealogy websites, including Geneanet, a collection of inter-searchable genealogical databases currently containing references to more than 225 million persons.

Notable features of GeneWeb include:

- High capacity:
  - GeneWeb can allow multiple wizards to manage the genealogical database.
  - GeneWeb can manage large databases: for example, the Roglo database contains over 10 million entries, managed by more than 200 wizards.
- Web Server: When GeneWeb runs on a computer connected to the internet, it can accept HTTP requests from web clients, generating and serving HTML web pages and linked objects (images, etc.).
- GEDCOM: GeneWeb supports import and export of GEDCOM files.
- UTF-8: GeneWeb supports UTF-8.
