= Gerald Glaskin =

Australian author

Gerald Marcus Glaskin
- Born: 16 December 1923; Perth, Western Australia
- Died: 11 March 2000 (aged 76); Perth, Western Australia
- Writing career
- Pen name: Neville Jackson

Gerald Glaskin (G. M. Glaskin) (16 December 1923 – 11 March 2000) was an Australian author.

== Biography ==
=== Early life ===
Gerald Marcus Glaskin was born on 16 December 1923 in North Perth in Western Australia.

He attended Perth Modern School and served in the Second World War in the Royal Australian Navy and Royal Australian Air Force.

=== Career ===
His published works were extensive. He wrote poetry, short stories, and novels. Some works also included issues of science fiction and new-age spiritual guidance related to the interpretation of dreams. He was also involved in the Western Australian Fellowship of Australian Writers.

Some sources claim that he won the Commonwealth Prize for Literature in 1955, but subsequent research has disproved this, finding that he was awarded a grant in 1957 which he could not retain due to living outside Australia at the time. His works were received more favourably in Europe than in Australia. He lived mostly in Asia and later the Netherlands, until returning to Perth in 1967. His extensive time overseas may have been because of the oppressive Australian moral climate of the period against homosexuality. In 1961, he had been charged with indecent exposure on a Perth beach.

A resident of Cottesloe, he was enthusiastic about its beach environment. As a writer in Western Australia conditions were not always supportive of the profession.

His involvement with the Christos experiment saw his writing a number of books related to the subject.

His novel A Waltz Through the Hills was made into a 1988 film of the same title. His most commercially successful work was a novel about a homosexual love affair, No End To The Way (1965), published under the pseudonym Neville Jackson.

Interviewed in later life about the novel, Glaskin said: "It was banned in Australia and the paperback publishers, Corgi, researched the Australian censorship laws, and discovered that the book could not be shipped to Australia. So they chartered planes and flew them in". It was partly autobiographical, and inspired by his relationships with Dutch men. It was published before he started his relationship with noted genealogist Leo van de Pas, whom he met in 1968 in a gay bar in Amsterdam, and lived with from then onwards till the end of his life.

He was also a silent financial partner in The Coffee Pot, a popular Perth meeting place for homosexuals, bohemians and students which was established in the 1950s by Dutch Indonesian migrants, and was then the city's only late night cafe.

In 1967, he met the British writer Iris Murdoch, who was visiting Australia. In a letter to her friend Brigid Brophy, she wrote: "...the opera house is the most beautiful single object I've seen since getting here (with the possible exception of a West Australian novelist called Jerry Glaskin, whom I had reluctantly to leave behind in Perth)".

=== Death ===
He died on 11 March 2000 after a long illness.

== Works ==
Year	Title	Publisher	ISBN	Notes
1955	A World of Our Own	James Barrie		Fiction
1957	A Minor Portrait	James Barrie		Fiction
1957	The Mistress	Panther Books		Fiction
1959	The Beach of Passionate Love	Barrie & Rockliff		Fiction
1960	A Lion in the Sun	Barrie & Rockliff		Fiction
1960	A Change of Mind	Doubleday		Fiction
1960	The Land That Sleeps: Travel and Adventure in the Virgin West of Australia	Doubleday		Travel literature
1961	A Waltz Through the Hills	Barrie & Rockliff		Children's fiction Illustrated by Paul Rigby
1962	A Small Selection of Short Stories	Barrie & Rockliff		Short story collection
1963	Flight to Landfall	Barrie & Rockliff		Fiction
1965	No End to the Way	Corgi		Fiction; Published under Neville Jackson pseudonym
1965	The Man Who Didn't Count	Delacorte Press		Fiction
1967	The Road to Nowhere	Barrie & Rockliff		Short story collection
1967	A Bird in my Hands	Herbert Jenkins		Autobiography
1972	The Inheritors	Mercury Press		Short story first published in the Magazine of Fantasy & Science Fiction
1974	Windows of the Mind : the Christos Experience	Wildwood House	0704501171	Nonfiction
1975	Two Women: Two Novellas	Ure Smith	0725402172	Collection of novellas: Turn on the Heat and the Eaves of Night
1976	Worlds Within: Probing the Christos Experience	Wildwood House	0704502151	Nonfiction
1984	One Way to Wonderland: Letters to a Pen-friend in Europe, 1938-1945	Fremantle Press	0909144915	Collected correspondence
1995	A Many-Splendoured Woman: A Memoir of Han Suyin	Graham Brash	9812180451	Biography
