= Kith and Kin Pro =

Geneaology software

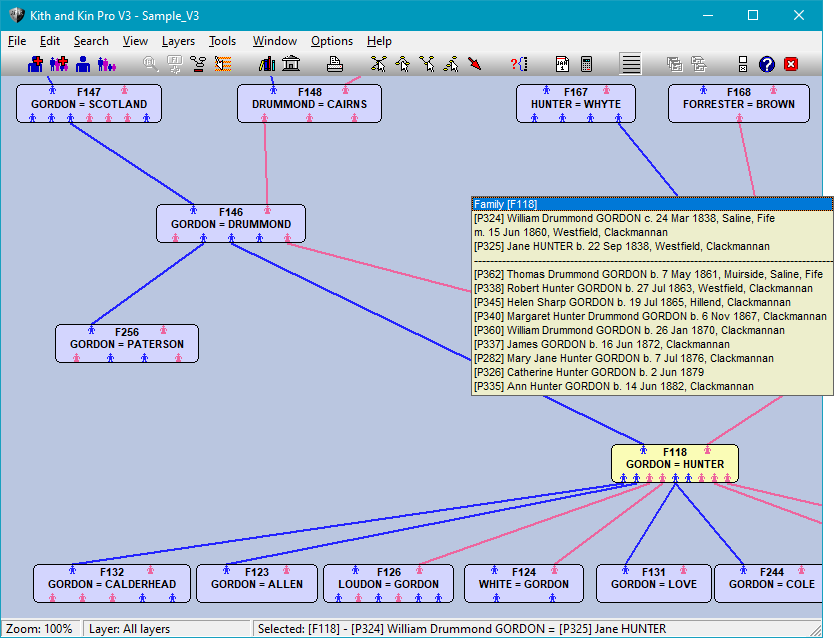
- Original author: Nick Hunter
- Developer: SpanSoft
- Initial release: January 1999; 27 years ago
- Stable release: 3.3.0 / September 14, 2019; 6 years ago
- Operating system: Windows
- Size: 8MB
- Available in: English (Customizable output for other languages)
- Type: Genealogy software
- License: Shareware
- Website: kithkinpro.spansoft.org

Kith and Kin Pro is genealogy software for computers running Microsoft Windows. The program aids family historians by storing, querying and documenting family history. Developed by SpanSoft, Scotland, the software is distributed as shareware with a free trial period of 30 days.

== Features ==
Unique, whole-tree display allows instant access to the data in any part of the family tree. Multi-layering feature splits the list of families into a more easily managed display for large trees. The software imports and exports GEDCOM files and exports Web pages. Data searches can be carried out using simple criteria or SQL statements.

== History ==
The immediate predecessor of Kith and Kin Pro was the software "Kith and Kin", a Windows 3.1 program developed by Nick Hunter and released as shareware in 1993. "Kith and Kin" was one of the first Windows genealogy programs to be produced. To avoid confusion with the older MS-DOS software "Kith and Kin" developed by Coherent Software, Australia, the program was marketed as "Of that Ilk" in Australia and New Zealand only. "Of that Ilk Pro" V1 and V2 were released as the Australia and New Zealand versions of Kith and Kin Pro V1 and V2 but the name was dropped with the release of Kith and Kin Pro V3.

- Kith and Kin Pro version 1 was released in January 1999.
- Kith and Kin Pro version 2 was released on 10 September 2002.
- Kith and Kin Pro version 3 was released on 10 May 2009.

== Data format ==
Kith and Kin Pro stores data in a multi-file, relational database using the built-in DBISAM engine. Data can also be imported and exported as GEDCOM files.
