= Family Historian =

Genealogy software program

- Original author: Simon Orde
- Developer: Calico Pie Limited
- Release: 2002; 24 years ago
- Stable release: 8.0.6 / November 18, 2026; 0 days ago
- Operating system: Windows
- Type: Genealogy software
- License: Retail
- Website: www.family-historian.co.uk

Family Historian is a genealogy software program for Windows. designed and written by Calico Pie Limited, a UK software company founded by Simon Orde in 1995. Family Historian has won numerous awards, including coming top in the two most recent group comparisons of top genealogy programs, by Which? Computing - one of the Which? stable of consumer magazines. In 2019, 2020, 2021 and 2022 it received the highest overall score from TopTenReviews, in a group comparison with other leading genealogy software worldwide.

The program can be used to generate charts and diagrams, reports, maps, books & booklets, websites, and family tree CDs & DVDs. Reports and books can be saved in rich-text format, suitable for editing in a word-processor. Diagrams, charts, reports and books can all be saved in PDF format. Pictures can be linked to all the people in them (each person is linked directly to their face in the picture). The program also features a map window (with a choice of map types), web hints (automatic matching of data in databases on the Internet), an automatic source citation pane (to make adding sources easy), web clipping tools (for extracting data from web pages), internet search tools, interactive 'smart trees', multi-level undo/redo, and more. Users can extend the program themselves by creating plugins using scripting tools which are included with each copy. Plugins can be shared with other users by uploading them to the Family Historian Plugin Store. All plugins are free for Family Historian users.

Version 8 introduces a Free Edition with reduced features, allowing import/export, data maintenance and searching. A free companion app, Family Historian Mobile, is currently available for Android devices, with an iPhone/iPad version in public Beta testing.

== Platforms ==
Family Historian was designed to run on the Windows platform, however some users run Family Historian on Linux machines using Wine.
