= GenealogyJ =

Viewer and editor for genealogic data

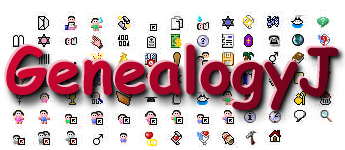

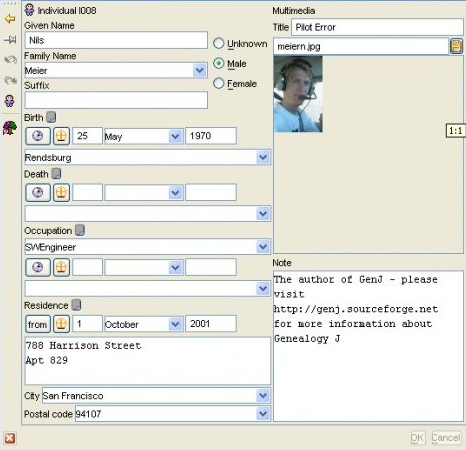
- Edit person screenshot
- Original author: Nils Meier
- Developer: The GenealogyJ Team
- Release: August 2, 1998; 27 years ago
- Stable release: 3.0 / 19 February 2010
- Platform: Java
- Available in: Multilingual (11)
- Type: Genealogy software
- License: GPL-2.0-or-later
- Website: sourceforge.net/projects/genj/

GenealogyJ is a viewer and editor for genealogic data, suitable for hobbyists, family historians and genealogy researchers. GenealogyJ is written in Java and so is available on most operating systems and supports the GEDCOM 5.5.1 standard. Many reports like family tree, table, timeline and geography are available.
