= Webtrees =

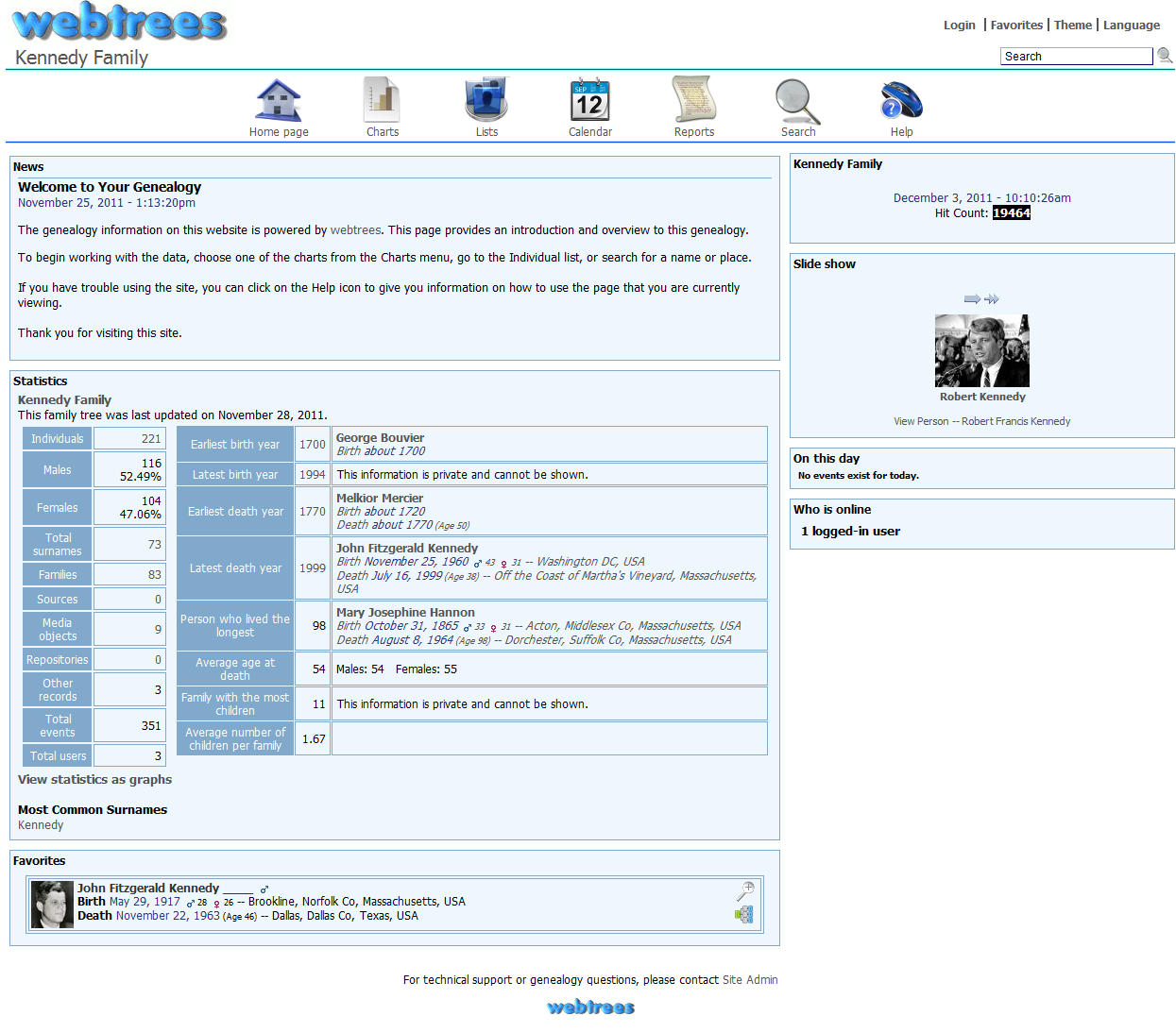
- webtrees 1.2.4
- Original authors: Greg Roach and John Finlay (PhpGedView)
- Developers: Greg Roach; The webtrees team
- Release: August 26, 2010; 15 years ago
- Stable release: 2.2.6 / 29 April 2026
- Written in: PHP, JavaScript
- Available in: 36 languages
- List of languages Arabic, Bosnian, Bulgarian, Catalan, Chinese, Croatian, Czech, Danish, Dutch, English (GB, US), Estonian, Finnish, French, German, Greek, Hebrew, Hungarian, Icelandic, Italian, Lithuanian, Korean, Norwegian (Bokmål and Nynorsk), Persian, Polish, Portuguese (BR, PT), Russian, Slovak, Slovene, Spanish, Swedish, Tatar, Turkish, Ukrainian and Vietnamese. Partial translations for Yiddish, Galician, Indonesian, Romanian, Serbian and Japanese.
- Type: Genealogy software
- License: GPL-3.0-or-later
- Website: webtrees.net
- Repository: github.com/fisharebest/webtrees

webtrees is a free and open-source web-based genealogy application intended for collaborative use.

It requires a web server that has PHP and MySQL installed.

It is compatible with standard 5.5.1-GEDCOM files.

== History ==
webtrees is a fork of PhpGedView, it was created in early 2010, when a majority of active PhpGedView developers stopped using SourceForge due to issues with exporting encrypted software. webtrees is the second fork of PhpGedView. In late 2005 the first one, called Genmod, was created.

On 26 July 2010, a month before version 1.0.0 of webtrees was released, Dick Eastman, who publishes Eastman's Online Genealogy Newsletter, introduced webtrees as "the wave of the future."

The day version 1.0.0 of webtrees was released, Tamura Jones reviewed and compared Webtrees with PhpGedView.
