= GENDEX =

Genealogical file format

GENDEX File
- Filename extension: gendex.txt
- Type of format: Genealogy data exchange

GENDEX (GENealogical inDEX) File is a specification to export the index of a genealogical home page to a global name index service. It was developed by Eugene W. Stark as a feature of his GEDCOM to HTML translator software, GED2HTML. Stark's GENDEX site originally accepted the GENDEX files until that site was retired in 2004. Another site that continued to support the format, was the GenDex Network, from 4 April 2013 to August 2021, when it became a spam site. The GenDex Network was the direct successor to the TNG Network created by Darrin Lythgoe and is based in part on the code used in the TNG Network.

== Format ==
Each line in a GENDEX file represents the reference to a person record. Each GENDEX record has the following fields, each terminated by a '|' character:

Reference|SURNAME|given name /SURNAME/|date of birth|place of birth|date of death|place of death|

- Field 1: file name of web page referring to the individual
- Field 2: surname of the individual
- Field 3: full name of the individual
- Field 4: date of birth or christening (optional)
- Field 5: place of birth or christening (optional)
- Field 6: date of death or burial (optional)
- Field 7: place of death or burial (optional)

The full name field and the date fields have the format as it appears in the GEDCOM NAME and DATE record.

== Example ==
E.g. the URL to a genealogical person record is http://domain.com/index.php?individual=I0001. The first part including the '=' is the static base URL, which is constant for each person record. The 'I0001' is the variable part, which refers each individual. The GENDEX file could look like this:

I0001|MILLER|Jhon A. /MILLER/|30 JUN 1899|Berlin|20 SEP 1905|Hamburg|
I0002|SMITH|Ann /SMITH/||England|||
...
