= Kith =

Kith or KITH may refer to:

== Business ==
- Kith (brand), New York streetwear company

== Radio ==
- KITH (FM), a radio station of Hawaii, United States

== Science fiction ==
- Kith (Poul Anderson), a spacefaring civilization featured in a number of stories by American sci-fi author Poul Anderson

== Entertainment and culture ==
- Kidz in the Hall, an American hip hop duo from Chicago, Illinois
- The Kids in the Hall, Canadian sketch comedy group

== Transportation ==
- KITH, the ICAO code for Ithaca Tompkins International Airport

== See also ==
- Kith and Kin Pro
- Keith (disambiguation)
