= PhpGedView =

Free web-based genealogy software

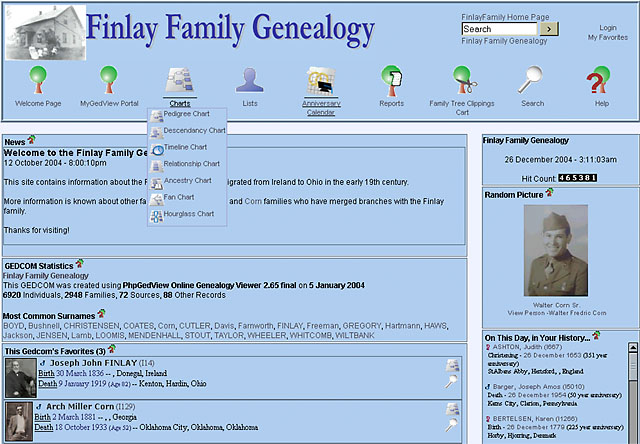
- Sample PhpGedView web page
- Original author: John Finlay
- Developer: The PhpGedView Team
- Release: June 2002; 24 years ago
- Stable release: 4.3.0 / 7 November 2017
- Written in: PHP
- Operating system: Web server
- Type: Genealogy software
- License: GPL-2.0-or-later
- Website: www.phpgedview.net
- Repository: sourceforge.net/projects/phpgedview

PhpGedView is free and open-source web-based genealogy software written in PHP. It was created by John Finlay and first released on SourceForge in June 2002. The software displays and edits genealogy data through a web browser, using GEDCOM as its central data format.

PhpGedView was named SourceForge Project of the Month in December 2003 and became one of the more visible early web-based genealogy applications. In 2010, several active developers forked the project to create webtrees.

== History ==
John Finlay created PhpGedView after looking for a dynamic GEDCOM-to-HTML converter for his own genealogy website. The project was released on SourceForge in June 2002 and reached version 1.0 later that year.

SourceForge selected PhpGedView as its Project of the Month for December 2003. The SourceForge profile described it as a PHP genealogy program for sharing family-tree information on the web, and noted that the project had risen into the top projects on the site after its 2002 release.

Version 4.3.0, the last stable release listed on SourceForge, was released on 7 November 2017. In 2010, a majority of active developers moved away from PhpGedView and created the webtrees fork.

== Features ==
PhpGedView is a multi-user genealogy application designed to run on a web server. It allows users to view, edit, and collaborate on family-tree data through a browser. LinuxLinks describes the software as supporting GEDCOM import, online editing, privacy controls, multimedia references, charts, reports, themes, and modules.

The software can generate reports and diagrams, export output as PDF, and produce pedigree, descendancy, and timeline charts. It includes privacy controls for restricting access to living people or to records visible only to registered users. PhpGedView version 4.1 and later also supported output to the Gramps XML format.

PhpGedView could be extended using modules, including integrations with phpBB, Lightbox, Google Maps, and content-management systems.

== See also ==
- Comparison of web-based genealogy software
- GEDCOM
- webtrees
