= Tiny Tafel =

- Filename extension: .tt
- Internet media type: text/plain
- Developed by: Specification released by CommSoft 1986; 39 years ago.
- Type of format: Genealogy data matching system

The Tiny Tafel format [tye-nee tahf-uhl] provides a compact way of describing the main surnames found in a family genealogy, which can be read by humans and matched by computers using a Tafel Matching System. The Tiny Tafel lists the Soundex encoded representation of each surname (to allow for matching surnames with spelling variations), accompanied by a corresponding range of dates and locations associated with the surname. Many genealogy programs can produce Tiny Tafel reports. Tiny Tafels were traditionally posted to public forums, such as a BBS (Bulletin Board System) and are still regularly used today with a number of internet sites that provide a Tafel Matching System, in order to indicate whether two genealogical databases have a probable connection or overlap.

Paul Andereck, former editor of Genealogical Computing magazine, proposed the idea and the specification was developed by Commsoft in 1986.

== Example ==
- sample.tt
- N Howard L. Nurse A COMMSOFT A 2257 Old Middlefield Way A Mountain View, CA  94043 T (415) 967-1900 S FidoNet 143/26 B COMMSOFT BBS/(415) 967-6730 C 2400/B/X D 5/IBM DSDD/360 F ROOTS II R Sample Kennedy database Z 29 A252 1915 1947 Auchincloss/MA B160 1698 1933 Bouvier/Long Island NY B530 1906 1939 Bennett/New York B620 1869 1933 Burke/Suffolk Co. MA C200 1803 1833 Cox\Ind C414 1861 1899 Caulfield\Norfolk Co. MA/Suffolk Co. MA C540 1868 1928 Connelly/Suffolk Co. MA F326 1690 1890 Fitzgerald/Suffolk Co. MA F430 1806 1836 Field/PA H200 1806 1857 Hickey/Suffolk Co. MA H500 1802 1865 Hannon/Middlesex Co. MA K500 1858 1892 Kane\Ireland/Suffolk Co. MA K530 1793*1957:Kennedy\Ireland/New York K530 1793*1984 Kennedy\Ireland/Wstchster Co. NY L000 1847 1906 Lee\MA/MA L163 1923 1961 Lawford\England/L.A. Co. CA L532 1753 1783 Lindsay\MA M500 1847 1890 Mahoney\Suffolk Co. MA/Suffolk Co. MA M610 1791 1821 Murphy/Wxfrd Co. IRE M626 1710 1766 Mercier\MA R324 1929 1959 Radziwill\MA S240 1892 1928 Skakel\Cook Co. IL/Cook Co. IL S530 1927 1960 Smith\Kings Co. NY/Suffolk Co. MA S616 1915 1965 Shriver\Carroll Co. MD/Suffolk Co. MA S625 1831 1861 Sergeant\MA T525 1947 1983 Townsend\Baltimore Co. MD/Middlesex Co. MA T653 1706 1736 Trintignant/IT V650 1783 1813 Vernou\CN/CN W453 1767 1797 Wilmouth\NH/MA W 11 Dec 1986
