= The Next Generation of Genealogy Sitebuilding =

Genealogy software

- Original author: Darrin Lythgoe
- Initial release: 2001; 24 years ago
- Stable release: 15.0.3 / July 31, 2025; 3 months ago
- Written in: PHP
- Operating system: Cross-platform, Windows, Mac OS X
- Available in: Multilingual
- Type: Genealogy software
- License: Proprietary software
- Website: tngsitebuilding.com

The Next Generation of Genealogy Sitebuilding or TNG is a genealogy software installed in a web server developed by Darrin Lythgoe. It was mentioned in several press reviews used for genealogy site building. The data is stored in MySQL database tables and displayed in PHP scripting language which can be a module in different content management system platforms.

== Languages ==
The public and administrative display messages can be translated into Afrikaans, Croatian, Czech, Danish, Dutch, Finnish, French, German, Greek, Italian, Norwegian, Polish, Brazilian Portuguese, Romanian, Spanish and Swedish, and public messages can be translated into Icelandic and Serbian while help files and installation instructions can also be translated into French and Dutch.

== Features ==
- User account registration
- Pedigree, relationship, descendancy, register charts
- What's New and Most Wanted pages
- RSS
- CMS Integrations such as WordPress and Joomla
