= Genealogy software =

Software for family history research

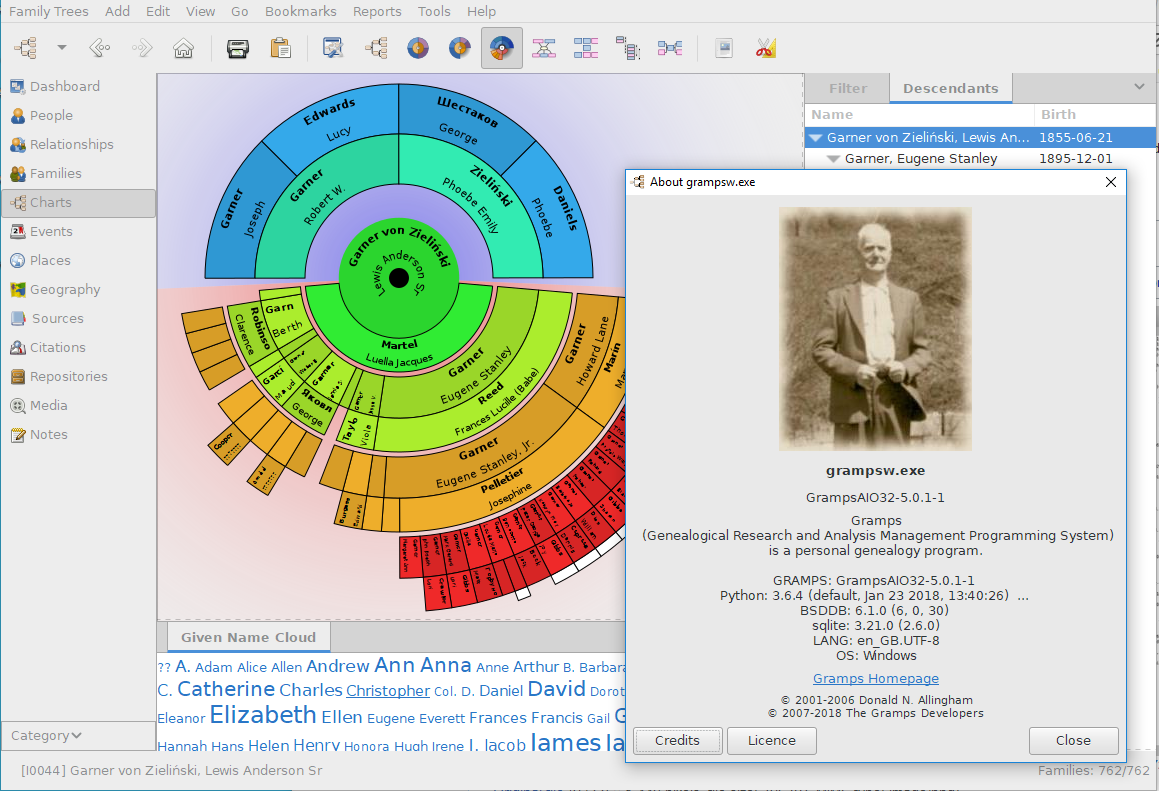
Gramps is an example of stand-alone open source genealogy software.

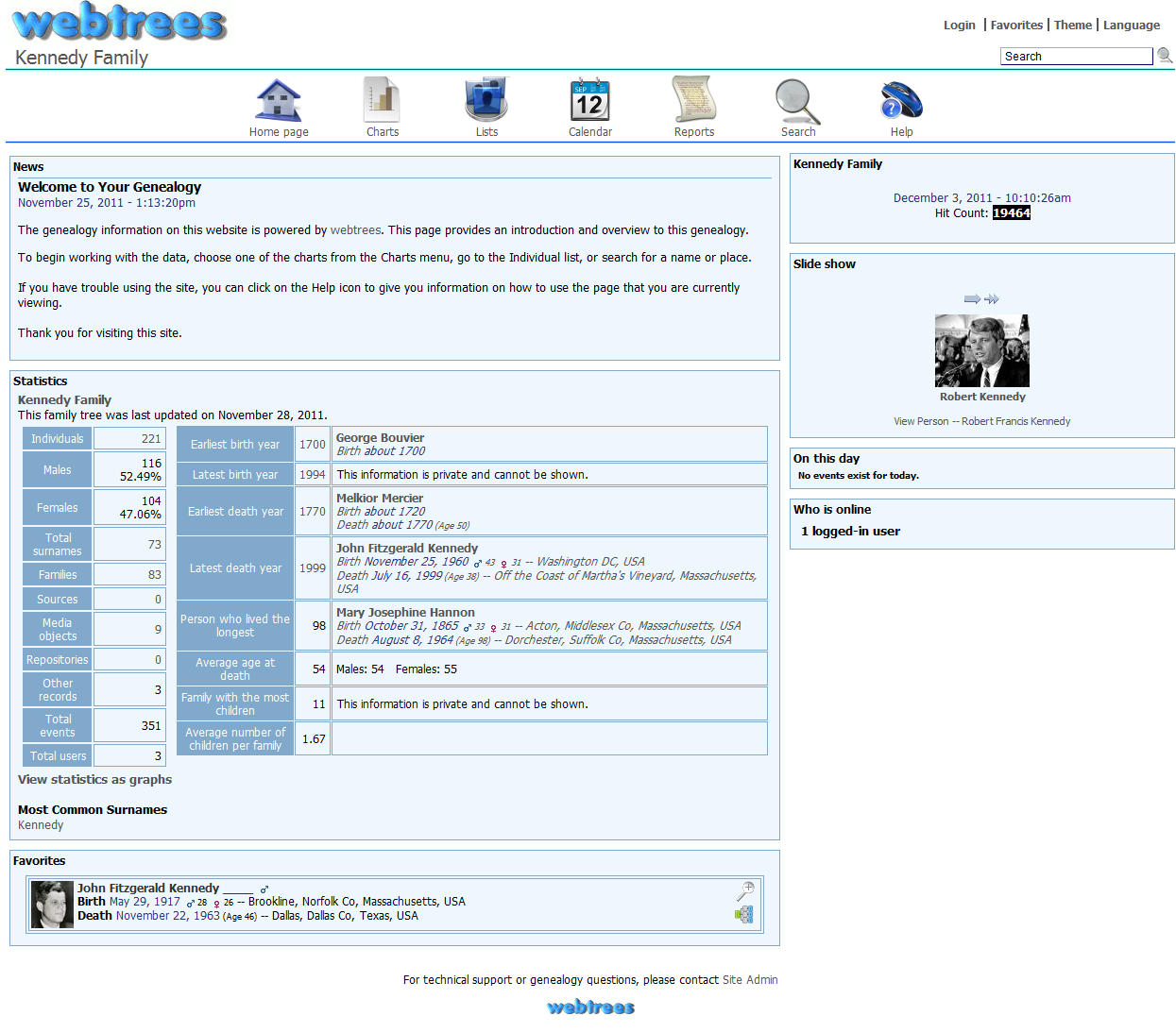
Webtrees is an example of a web-based open source genealogy software.

Genealogy software is computer software used to record, organize, and publish genealogical data.

== Features ==
At a minimum, genealogy software collects the date and place of an individual's birth, marriage, and death, and stores the relationships of individuals to their parents, spouses, and children. Some programs are more flexible than others in allowing for the input of children born out of wedlock or for varying types of spousal relationships. Additionally, most genealogy programs handle additional events in an individual's life, notes, photographs and multimedia, and source citations. Genealogy software programs can produce a variety of graphical charts and text reports, such as pedigree charts, ahnentafel reports, and Register reports. Some desktop applications generate HTML pages for web publishing; there are stand-alone web applications, as well. Most genealogy programs can import and export using the GEDCOM standard.

There are also some programs that allow users to create Genograms which can be used by scientists, social workers, doctors, and others to get a graphical view of additional information.

Some programs include additional fields relevant to particular religions. Others focus on certain geographical regions. For example, having a field for the family's coat of arms is only relevant if the family comes from a part of the world that uses them.

While most programs and applications are desktop-based, there are a number of web-based products in the genealogy software market.

Many genealogy applications focus on data management in that they allow users to manage all the information they collect on individuals, families, and events. Other tools available to the genealogist include research management tools, mapping tools, charting programs, and web-publishing programs.

== Sharing ==
Most genealogy software allows export of data in GEDCOM format, which can then be shared with people using different genealogy software. Some genealogy applications use GEDCOM internally and therefore work directly with GEDCOM data. Certain programs allow the user to restrict what information is shared, usually by inhibiting export of some or all personal information about living people for privacy reasons.

== See also ==
- Comparison of web-based genealogy software
- List of genealogy databases
