= FDB =

FDB may refer to:

- FDB (file format), a computer font file format
- "FDB" (song), by Young Dro
- Fællesforeningen for Danmarks Brugsforeninger, a Danish cooperative
- Faridabad railway station, in Haryana, India
- Father David Bauer Olympic Arena, in Calgary, Alberta, Canada
- Final Destination: Bloodlines, a 2025 American supernatural horror film
- Film Development Board, in Nepal
- First DataBank, an American pharmaceutical publisher
- Fluid dynamic bearing
- Flydubai, an Emirati airline
- FoundationDB, a database developed by Apple Inc.
- Frank de Boer, Dutch former footballer
- Fredrik deBoer, American academic and author
