= Sara Japhet =

Israeli biblical scholar (1934–2024)

- שרה יפת
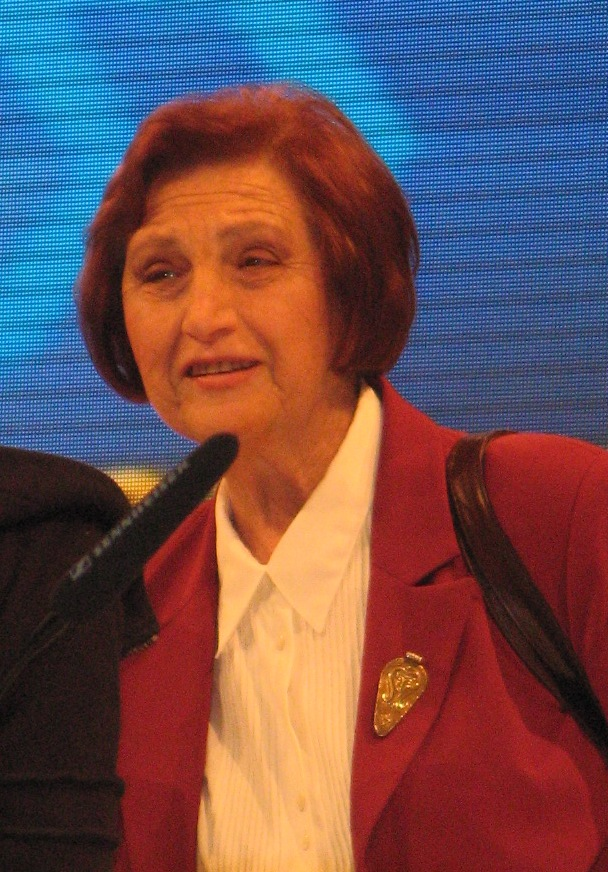
- Japhet in 2010
- Born: Sara Isaacson; November 18, 1934; Petah Tikva, Mandatory Palestine
- Died: March 27, 2024 (aged 89)
- Occupation: Biblical scholar
- Known for: her work on the Books of Chronicles
- Title: Yehezkel Kaufmann Professor Emeritus of Bible Studies at the Hebrew University of Jerusalem
- Relatives: Gilad Japhet
- Awards: Israel Prize for Biblical Studies

Academic background
- Education: Hebrew University (Ph.D.)
- Thesis: (1973)

Academic work
- Discipline: Biblical studies
- Sub-discipline: Hebrew scriptures
- Institutions: Hebrew University of Jerusalem

Sara Japhet (sometimes Sarah Yefet,שרה יפת ; November 18, 1934 – March 27, 2024) was an Israeli biblical scholar. She was the Yehezkel Kaufmann Professor Emerita of Bible Studies at the Hebrew University of Jerusalem. She is considered a leading authority on the books of Chronicles by Oxford University Press. Additionally, she is the recipient of the Israel Prize in 2004 for Biblical Studies.

== Biography ==
Japhet was born in Petah Tikva to parents who had immigrated to Palestine in the 1920s. She studied at the Hebrew Teachers College David Yellin in Jerusalem and became one of the first students involved in the academic teacher training program conducted with the Hebrew University. Later, she taught immigrants to Israel at night school. She earned her PhD from Hebrew University in 1973. She has held the positions of head of the Department of Bible and head of the Institute of Jewish Studies at the Hebrew University and has also been the director of the National and University Library between 1997 and 2001.

Japhet won the Israel Prize in 2004 for her contribution to Biblical studies focusing on the Second Temple period. Japhet has held the position of president of the World Union of Jewish Studies since 2006.

In 2007, a Festschrift was published in her honor. Shai le-Sara Japhet: Studies in the Bible, Its Exegesis and Language Presented to Sara Japhet included contributions from Adele Berlin, Tamara Eskenazi, Gary Knoppers, David J. A. Clines, J. Cheryl Exum, Jacob Milgrom, Yairah Amit, and Emanuel Tov.

Her son Gilad Japhet is a businessman and an Israeli genealogist, CEO and founder of MyHeritage.

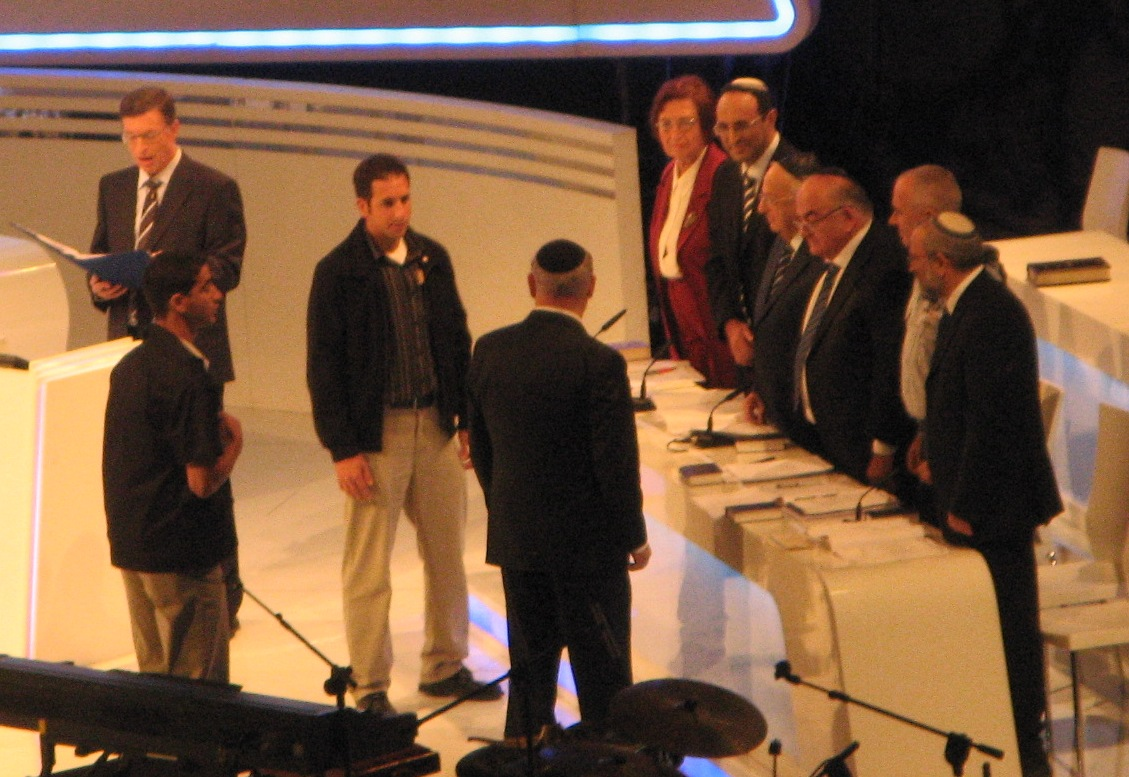
Japhet, as a judge in the Adult Bible Quiz, greets Prime Minister Benjamin Netanyahu.

Sara Japhet died on March 27, 2024, at the age of 89.

== Her receipt of the Israel Prize ==
From the judges' reasoning for awarding the Israel Prize to Sarah Japhet in 2004:

Prof. Sarah Japhet is one of the leading scholars of Biblical Studies in Israel and holds a prominent position in international research. Her studies demonstrate a broad perspective on the available evidence, deep analysis of philological and historical data, and an impressive ability for critical examination and judgment.

One of her primary areas of interest is the biblical historiography of the early Second Temple period, with the Book of Chronicles as its most prominent representative. Prof. Japhet's groundbreaking work on the worldview reflected in this book and its place in biblical thought sheds new and fundamental light on the Book of Chronicles. Her research highlights the book’s unique contribution to understanding literary and ideological developments in post-biblical Jewish thought.

Her comprehensive and detailed commentary on the Book of Chronicles is among the most significant interpretations of the text to date. In addition to these two major works, Prof. Japhet has published studies that make substantial contributions to the understanding of the books of Ezra and Nehemiah and to specific issues related to the Persian period.

Sarah Japhet is among those who have established biblical studies in Israel as a central discipline in the study of Jewish culture.

== Personal life ==
She was married to attorney Gideon Japhet, who died in 2013, and they had four children. Their son, Gilad Japhet, is an Israeli entrepreneur and genealogist, the CEO and founder of MyHeritage.

== Works ==
- Japhet, Sara (1989). The Ideology of the Book of Chronicles and its Place in Biblical Thought. Frankfurt am Main; New York: P. Lang. ISBN 978-3-8204-8994-1. OCLC 21161930.
- ———; Salters, Robert B., eds. (1985). The Commentary of R. Samuel ben Meir, Rashbam, on Qoheleth. Jerusalem; Leiden: Magnes Press; Hebrew University; E. J. Brill. ISBN 978-9-6522-3517-6. OCLC 12685924.
- ——— (1986). Studies in Bible, 1986. Scripta Hierosolymitana. Vol. 31. Jerusalem: Magnes Press; Hebrew University. OCLC 15865970.
- ——— (1993). I & II Chronicles: a commentary. Old Testament library. Louisville, KY: Westminster, John Knox Press. ISBN 978-0-6642-1845-4. OCLC 28149641.
- ——— (2006). From the Rivers of Babylon to the Highlands of Judah: collected studies on the Restoration period. Winona Lake, IN: Eisenbrauns. ISBN 978-1-575-06121-4. OCLC 70284383.

n.b. other titles have been written in Hebrew.
