= Legacy Family Tree =

Genealogy software

- Legacy Family Tree Homepage
- Original authors: Ken McGinnis, Dave Berdan.
- Developer: Millennia Corporation / MyHeritage
- Initial release: June 1997; 28 years ago
- Stable release: 10.0.0.271 / October 30, 2025; 1 day ago
- Operating system: Windows
- Size: 70MB
- Available in: Multilingual (11 languages/dialects and 8 public testing translations)
- Type: Genealogy software
- License: Proprietary
- Website: legacyfamilytree.com/Index.asp

Legacy Family Tree is genealogy software for Windows that assists family historians in tracking, organizing, printing, and sharing family history. The software is distributed as freeware, with no restrictions, only requiring registration on the company's web site to download the software.

Previous versions (prior to 10.x) had a free edition with limited features; users had to pay a product activation fee to "unlock" the full suite of features.

Legacy's developer, Millennia Corporation, was purchased by MyHeritage in 2017.

== Features ==
Features of the software allow groups of people to coordinate their work and track each other's changes. When two files are open, entire lines can be dragged and dropped from one to the other. Multimedia support includes pictures, sound clips, and videos; images can be displayed individually, in slide shows, or as screen savers. The program imports and exports standard GEDCOM files and files from Personal Ancestral File (PAF). Links to the Internet allow searching online databases for any person in the family file.

Other features include search and replace, spell checking of all notes, source documentation features, and relationship calculation. For users entering U.S. information, the program issues a warning if the county entered did not exist at the time of the event. TempleReady reports can be produced by members of the Church of Jesus Christ of Latter-day Saints.

The deluxe edition (7.0) includes Legacy Charting. Legacy Charting locates all Legacy files on a hard drive, allows the creation of charts from any Legacy file, and uses a Chart Creation Wizard to help the user create a chart and customize the charts' appearance. They include large-scale wall charts, including drop-down descendancies, fan charts, hourglass charts and DNA charts. Locations where a person's ancestors lived can be automatically mapped.

Legacy's underlying database engine is stored using the Access Database Engine (ACE/JET): the Legacy database (*.fdb) can be opened in Microsoft Access.

== Languages available ==
A printed manual and tutorial videos are available in English; the program and the help files are available in several languages, referred to as international releases. In addition to English (Australian, Canadian, UK and US versions), the Danish, Dutch, French, German, Norwegian Nynorsk, Norwegian Bokmål, Swedish and Faroese versions have been released. Teams of volunteers are, in 2012, working on translations to Afrikaans, Chinese, Estonian, Finnish, Italian, Spanish, and Portuguese. The software does not support any other text encoding than Western script.

== History ==
After three years of development starting in 1995 by Ken McGinnis and Dave Berdan.

- Legacy version 1.0 was released in June 1997.
- Legacy version 2.0 was released on 17 Oct 1997.
- Legacy version 3.0 was released on 14 Dec 2000 as a free demo version from Legacy's website
- Legacy version 3.0 was released in 2001 as an official release.
- Legacy version 4.0 was released on 14 Mar 2002 as a free edition and a deluxe edition.
- Legacy version 5.0 was released on 18 Nov 2003.
- Legacy version 6.0 was released on 09 Aug 2005.
- Legacy version 7.0 was released on 02 Jun 2008.
- Legacy version 8.0 was released on 26 Nov 2013.
- Legacy version 9.0 was released on 17 Apr 2017.
- Legacy version 10.0 was released on 3 June 2024.

== Reception ==
Writing for Family Tree magazine, reviewer Rick Crume gave a positive review to Legacy Family Tree 8.0, stating that "This upgrade’s modern look, tools for organizing photos and integration with FamilySearch Family Tree maintain Legacy’s position among the best genealogy programs." In PCMag, reviewer Molly McLaughlin praised Legacy Family Tree 8.0's assortment of features in the free version, along with its comprehensive user guide, but she said that its interface is outdated.
