= MyHeritage =

Online genealogy platform

Coordinates: 32°01′18.0″N 34°51′31.2″E

- Company type: Private
- Available in: 42 languages: Afrikaans, Arabic, Armenian, Bulgarian, Catalan, Chinese (Mandarin), Chinese (Traditional), Croatian, Czech, Danish, Dutch, English, Estonian, Finnish, French, German, Greek, Hebrew, Hindi, Hungarian, Italian, Japanese, Korean, Latvian, Lithuanian, Macedonian, Malay, Norwegian, Persian, Polish, Portuguese, Portuguese (Brazil), Romanian, Russian, Serbian, Slovak, Slovene, Spanish, Swedish, Thai, Turkish, Ukrainian
- Headquarters: Or Yehuda, Israel
- Owners: MyHeritage Ltd, Francisco Partners
- Founder: Gilad Japhet (CEO)
- Key people: Gilad Japhet (CEO)
- Industry: Internet, genealogy, genetic genealogy
- Products: Family history website Genealogy software Mobile application MyHeritage DNA; MyHeritage DNA Health; Family Tree Builder
- Services: Online genealogy, DNA testing, historical-record search
- Employees: 531
- Website: myheritage.com
- Registration: Yes
- Launched: 2003; 23 years ago
- Current status: Active

MyHeritage is an online genealogy company with web, mobile, and software products and services, founded in Israel in 2003. Users of the platform can obtain their family trees, upload and browse through photos, and search through over 19.9 billion historical records, among other features. In early 2021 it was acquired by Francisco Partners, an American private equity firm, for $600 million.

As of 2023, the service supported 42 languages. In 2016, it launched a genetic testing service called MyHeritage DNA, with more than 6.5 million DNA kits in the company's database by March 2023. The company is headquartered in Or Yehuda, Israel, with additional offices in Tel Aviv, Israel; Lehi, Utah; Kyiv, Ukraine; and Burbank, California.

== History ==
=== 2003–2007: Foundation and early years ===
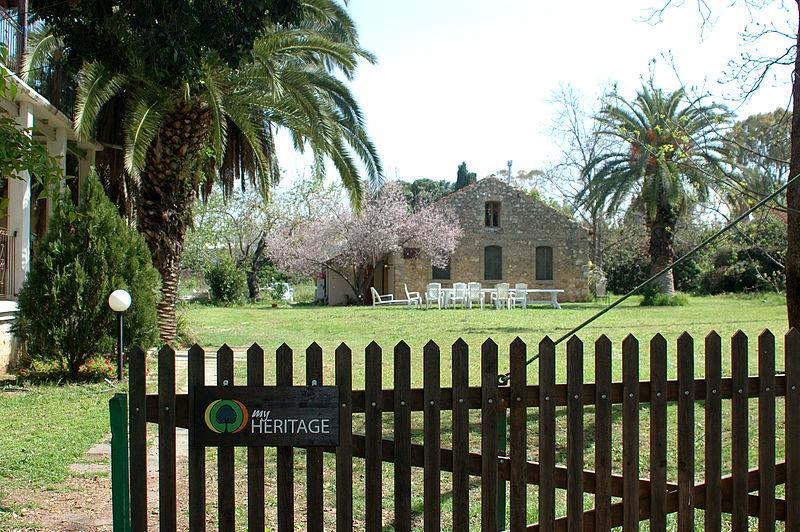
Original MyHeritage office in the village of Bnei Atarot, Israel

MyHeritage was founded in 2003 by Israeli entrepreneur Gilad Japhet (who continues to serve as the company's CEO). Japhet started the company from his living room in Bnei Atarot, Israel. For a long time, the company's headquarters were located in a family farmhouse in Bnei Atarot. In its infancy, MyHeritage was almost completely self-funded but had received funds from angel investors by 2005. It switched from a free service to a freemium business model.

Early on, MyHeritage required users to upload genealogical information from desktop software. The information could be viewed online but could not be altered. In 2006, MyHeritage introduced new features, including facial recognition software that recognized facial features from a database of photographs to link individuals together. In December 2006, the company acquired Pearl Street Software which was the creator of family tree software (Family Tree Legends) and a family tree submission site (GenCircles) with over 160 million profiles and 400 million public records.

By 2007, MyHeritage had 150,000 family trees, 180 million person profiles, 100 million photos, and 17.2 million users worldwide. The service was available in 17 languages. The company also began offering a new web-based feature that allowed users to upload genealogical information directly to the MyHeritage site. MyHeritage had also received a total of US$9 million in investor funding, half of which had come from Accel.

=== 2008–2012: Acquisitions and expansion ===
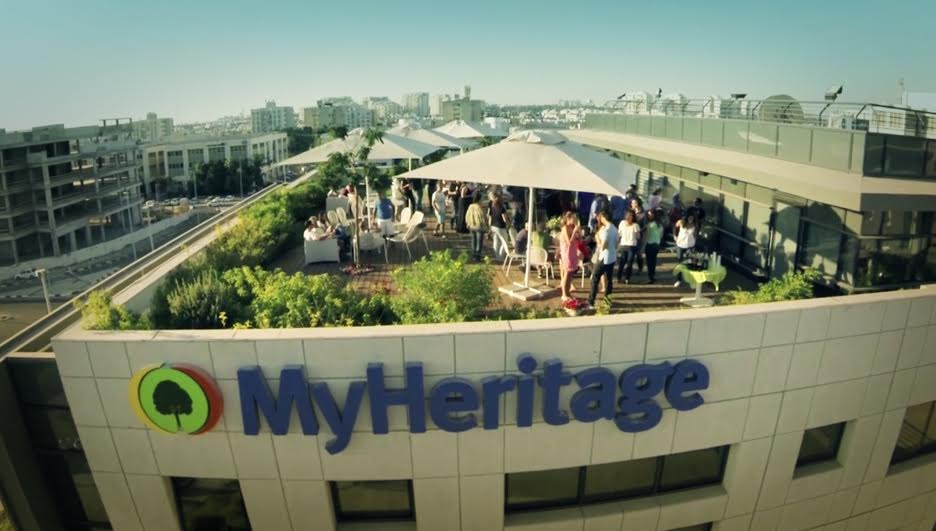
MyHeritage headquarters in Or Yehuda, Israel

In 2008, MyHeritage raised US$15 million from an investment group including Index Ventures and Accel. At that time, the website had grown to 260 million people profiles, 25 million users, 230 million photos, and 25 supported languages. Soon after securing funding, MyHeritage acquired Kindo, a UK-based family tree building service. In 2009, the company released a new version of their free genealogy software, Family Tree Builder, which included the ability to sync between the software and the website.

In 2010, the company acquired Germany-based OSN Group, a family tree website network with seven genealogy sites under its name. Some websites in the OSN network included Verwandt.de in Germany, Moikrewni.pl in Poland, and Dynastree.com in the United States. The acquisition provided MyHeritage with several new features (including coats of arms, family tree merging, and an option to venture into mobile applications) and a total of 540 million people profiles, 47 million active users, and 13 million family trees. In 2011, those numbers increased to 760 million people profiles and 56 million users after MyHeritage acquired Poland-based Bliscy.pl, another genealogy website.

Other 2011 acquisitions included the Dutch family network, Zooof; BackupMyTree, a backup service designed to protect up to 9 terabytes of offline family history data; and FamilyLink, a developer of family history content sites and owner of a large database of historical records (WorldVitalRecords.com, which included census, birth, death, and marriage records along with an archive of historical newspapers). By the end of 2011, MyHeritage had 60 million users, 900 million profiles, 21 million family trees, and was available in 38 different languages. The company also released the first version of its mobile app for iOS and Android devices.

In 2012, MyHeritage surpassed 1 billion people profiles and launched several new features, including SuperSearch, a search engine for billions of historical records, and Record Matching, a technology that automatically compares MyHeritage's historical records to the profiles on the site and alerts users whenever a match is found for a relative in their family tree.

In November 2012, MyHeritage acquired one of its primary competitors, Geni.com. The company kept all of Geni's employees and operated the company as a separate brand in Los Angeles, California, and, as of 2016, MyHeritage and Geni were still separate. Founded by David O. Sacks in 2007, Geni is a genealogy website with the goal of "creating a family tree of the whole world," whereas MyHeritage focuses on records and collecting non-merged individual family trees. The acquisition added 7 million new users to MyHeritage, bringing the total number of members to 72 million. At the time, MyHeritage also had 27 million family trees and 1,5 billion profiles and was available in 40 languages. In addition to the acquisition of Geni, MyHeritage also raised US$25 million in a funding round led by Bessemer Venture Partners.

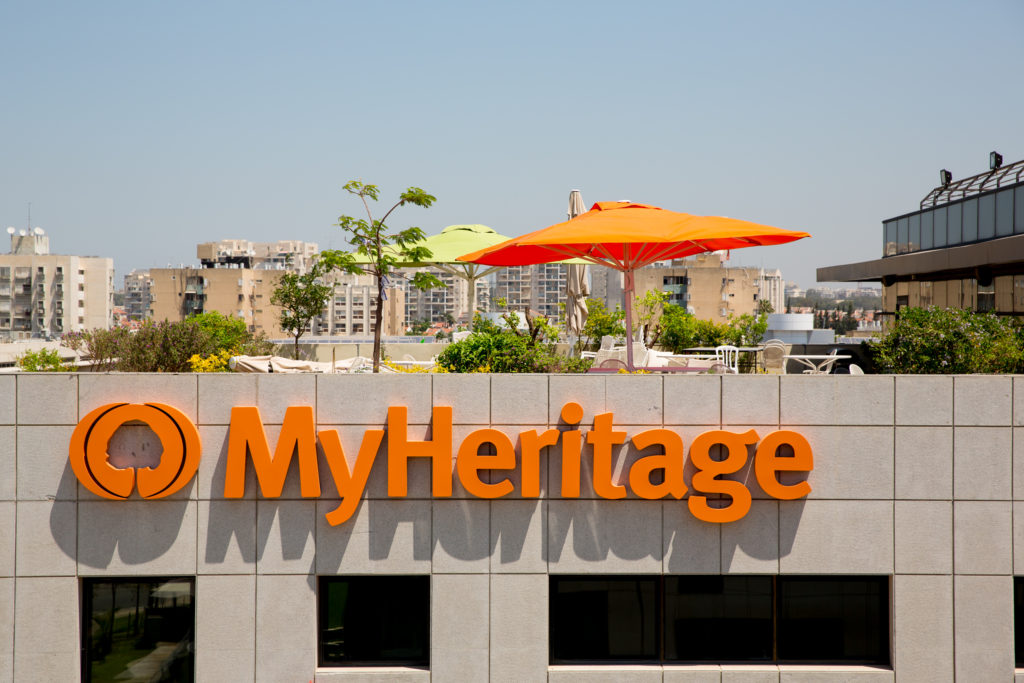

=== 2013–present: partnerships, further growth, and beyond ===
In 2013, MyHeritage entered into a partnership to allow FamilySearch to use its technologies. At the time of the deal, MyHeritage had 75 million registered users and 1.6 billion people profiles. The company also gained access to all United States census records from 1790 to 1940. In April 2013, MyHeritage released Family Tree Builder 7.0, which included new features like sync, Unicode, and record matches. MyHeritage also introduced a web feature called Record Detective that automatically makes connections between different historical records.

In 2014, MyHeritage announced partnerships and collaborations with other companies and entities. In February 2014, the company partnered with BillionGraves to digitize and document graves and cemeteries worldwide. In October 2014, the company partnered with EBSCO Information Services to provide educational institutions (libraries, universities, etc.) with free access to MyHeritage's database of historical records. In December 2014, MyHeritage entered into an agreement with the Danish National Archives to index census records and parish registers from 1646 to 1930 (a total of around 120 million records). The company also surpassed 5 billion historical records in their database in 2014 and launched the Instant Discoveries feature, which enables users to add whole branches of relatives to their family tree at once.

In 2015, MyHeritage reached 6.3 billion historical records, 200 million photographs, 80 million registered users, and availability in 42 languages. It also released the Global Name Translation technology, which automatically translates names from different languages to make searching for ancestors more efficient.

In March 2016, employees of MyHeritage recorded and preserved the family history of remote peoples in the Highlands Region of Papua New Guinea.

In August 2017, the company acquired Millennia Corp. and its Legacy Family Tree software and Legacy webinars program.

In 2018, the company announced its sponsorship of the Eurovision Song Contest 2019. It also announced that, as of October 2018, the total number of historical records reached over 9 billion. Also in 2018, chief science officer Yaniv Erlich received media attention for creating a family tree of 13 million people using data from Geni.com.

On September 7, 2019, MyHeritage announced that they had acquired both SNPedia and Promethease. All non-European raw genetic data files previously uploaded to Promethease, and not deleted by users by November 1, 2019, are to be copied to the MyHeritage website into new user accounts that will be created for them, these accounts will receive free services like ethnicity estimates and DNA matching for relatives.

In April 2019, MyHeritage changed the autosomal DNA microarray chip from the Infinium OmniExpress chip to the Infinium GSA chip, with 642,824 markers.

In early 2021, MyHeritage was acquired by Francisco Partners for a reported $600 million. In August that year, MyHeritage announced the acquisition of the French-based genealogy platform Filae, in a deal valued at €31.1 million.

In March 2024, MyHeritage launched a subscription-based newspaper archive website similar to other sites like Newspapers.com, and NewspaperArchive named OldNews. In October 2024, MyHeritage acquired MesAieux.com a French-Canadian genealogy website.

In October 2025, MyHeritage announced the transition from its older genotyping array technology to Whole Genome Sequencing (WGS) and that it would complete this upgrade by the end of 2025.

== Security incidents ==
In June 2018, it was announced that MyHeritage experienced a security breach that leaked the data of over 92 million users. According to the company, the breach occurred on October 26, 2017. The leak allowed the users' email addresses and hashed passwords to be compromised. MyHeritage stated that information about family trees, DNA profiles, and credit card information is stored on a separate system and was not part of the leak. The company notified customers on the day it discovered the breach and implemented two-factor authentication with support for text or app authentication as a response. In February 2019, the data from the breach appeared for sale on the dark web, along with account data from a number of other websites.

== Investigative genetic genealogy ==
Investigative genetic genealogy (IGG, or forensic genetic genealogy) is a process whereby law enforcement uses a public genealogy database to identify a suspect in a criminal investigation. Once a lab extracts a single-nucleotide polymorphism (SNP) profile from an unknown suspect's DNA, the data file is then uploaded to a public genetic genealogy database. A list of partial DNA matches is generated from the users who uploaded their own DNA data files into the database; investigators can then use that list of matches and public records to build a family tree that leads to the suspect.

The MyHeritage terms and conditions and privacy policy currently prohibit database use by law enforcement, a restriction that was codified after the company became aware of the database's use in a criminal investigation. The company also prohibits the creation of fictitious user profiles; however, because the database allows for users to upload DNA data files generated by other companies, investigators have had the means to use the database in homicide investigations.

=== People of California v. Joseph James DeAngelo (2018) ===
The most high-profile instance of IGG occurred in the investigation into the serial killings and rapes committed by someone nicknamed the Golden State Killer, who was eventually identified through IGG as Joseph James DeAngelo.

Initial reports indicated that DeAngelo was identified as a suspect through GEDmatch, and both FamilyTreeDNA and MyHeritage denied involvement in the DeAngelo case. But the chief executive of FamilyTreeDNA later told the Wall Street Journal that he gave law enforcement permission to use the database without knowing the case under investigation. The Los Angeles Times reported that when investigators were unsatisfied with the leads generated by both GEDmatch and FamilyTreeDNA, they utilized the MyHeritage database.

In an interview with the East Bay Times, civilian geneticist Barbara Rae-Venter came forward as the person who identified DeAngelo as a suspect. Rae-Venter stated that she was tapped by lead investigator Paul Holes to assist in the investigation. She reportedly uploaded the suspect's DNA data file on her personal MyHeritage account without notifying the company, a decision that was approved by an attorney with the FBI Division Counsel.

Following the use of the database in the DeAngelo case, MyHeritage revised its privacy policy to explicitly prohibit use by law enforcement.

=== State of Minnesota v. Jerry Arnold Westrom (2019) ===
In the reopened investigation into the 1993 murder of Jeanne “Jeanie” Childs, investigators sent the unidentified suspect’s DNA to DNA Solutions, Inc. in 2018 to create the SNP profile. In 2019—after failing to generate investigative leads through the GEDmatch database—investigators uploaded the suspect's DNA data file to the MyHeritage database under a pseudonym. They were then able to construct a list of DNA matches and engineer a family tree that led to Jerry Arnold Westrom. After identifying Westrom as a suspect through IGG, investigators retrieved a sample of Westrom's DNA from a discarded napkin, which matched the suspect's DNA profile.

This matter was addressed by the court. Westrom's defense attorney filed a motion to suppress the DNA evidence on the grounds that investigators violated Westrom's "reasonable expectation of privacy by accessing his genetic information on MyHeritage." The court denied this motion, however, arguing: "Law enforcement's possible violation of MyHeritage's service agreement might subject them to action from MyHeritage, but the Court does not see any reason why this violation of a private company's terms would implicate constitutional protections." Westrom did not raise the issue on appeal.

=== Identification of Juana Rosas-Zagal (2023) ===
According to civilian geneticist Leah Larkin, investigators in Riverside County, California, used the MyHeritage database to identify the remains of a woman whose body was discovered along the 60 Freeway in 1996. The SNP profile was created by Othram, Inc., a private genealogy lab located in The Woodlands, Texas, that specializes in investigative genetic genealogy. The remains were identified as those of 41-year-old Juana Rosas-Zagal.

The circumstances behind Rosas-Zagal's death are still unclear.

== Products and services ==
MyHeritage's products and services exist in the spheres of web, mobile, and downloadable software. The company's website, MyHeritage.com, works on a freemium business model. It is free to sign up and begin building family trees and making matches. The website will provide excerpts from historical records and newspapers, or from other family trees, but in order to read full versions of those documents, or confirm relationships, the user will have to have a paid subscription. Members of the Church of Jesus Christ of Latter-day Saints are eligible for free accounts due to the aforementioned partnership between MyHeritage and FamilySearch. Additionally, only paid users can contact other members.

As of 2015, the MyHeritage online database contained 6.3 billion historical records, including census, birth, marriage, death, military, and immigration documents, along with historical newspapers. In 2020 number of historical records has reached 12 billion, and by April 2023, the total number of historical records available has increased to 19.4 billion. The SuperSearch feature allows users to search through the site's entire catalog of historical records to find information about potential family members. Users may also upload photos to their family trees. MyHeritage's mobile app is available for iOS and Android devices and offers a range of similar features including the ability to view and edit family trees, research historical databases, and capture and share photos.

=== Matching technologies ===
MyHeritage uses several matching technologies for family history research. These include Smart Matching, Record Matching, Record Detective, Instant Discoveries, Global Name Translation, and Search Connect. Smart Matching is used to cross-reference one user's family tree with the family trees of all other users. The feature allows users to utilize information about their families from other, possibly related users. Record Matching is similar except that it matches and compares family trees to historical records rather than other family trees.

Record Detective is a technology that links related historical records based on information from one historical record. It also uses existing family trees to make connections between records (for instance, a death certificate and a marriage license). Instant Discoveries is a feature that compares users' family trees to other family trees and records, and then instantly shows them information about their family found in these sources, packaged as a new branch they can add to their trees. Global Name Translation allows users to search for a relative in their preferred language but get historical documents with their relative's name in other languages.

Search Connect is a feature announced by MyHeritage in July 2015 and released in November that same year. The feature indexes search queries along with their metadata dates, places, relatives, etc. and then displays them in search results when others perform a similar search. The feature allows users performing similar searches to connect with each other for collaboration.

=== Family Tree Builder ===
Family Tree Builder is downloadable software that allows users to build family trees, upload photos, view charts and statistics, and more.

=== MyHeritage DNA ===
MyHeritage DNA is a genetic testing service launched by MyHeritage in 2016. DNA results are obtained from home test kits, allowing users to use cheek swabs to collect samples. The results provide DNA matching and ethnicity estimates. In 2018, the company offered 5,000 of these kits as part of an initiative to reunite migrant families separated at the United States-Mexico border. The company also offered 15,000 DNA kits as part of a pro bono initiative called DNA Quest, which connected adoptees with biological parents. In 2016, MyHeritage launched a project to help children of Yemenite Jewish immigrants that had been forcefully separated from their families to reunite with their biological family. As of 2019, about 2.5 million MyHeritage DNA kits have been sold, making it the third most popular genealogical DNA testing company In April 2019, MyHeritage changed DNA microarray chip for autosomal tests from Infinium OmniExpress to the Infinium GSA chip, with 642,824 markers. In April 2019, MyHeritage began releasing data from a new DNA chip.

In January 2018, MyHeritage launched the Chromosome Browser, a tool that provides a visual representation of the 22 autosomal chromosome pairs, and which was improved in March of the same year with an option to compare up to 7 autosomal DNA matches at the same time in order to find shared common segments that can be used to indicate a common ancestor by triangulation.

In February 2019, MyHeritage launched the Theory of Family Relativity, a tool that works by incorporating the genealogical information contained in family trees with the company's collection of historical records and the shared DNA segments of users in order to predict different ways how two people that share DNA are related. The data used by this tool has been refreshed on a number of occasions, including an option to validate or to reject a theory

In May 2019, MyHeritage launched the MyHeritage DNA Health test, a test that provides comprehensive health reports to consumers. In December 2020, MyHeritage launched a feature called "Genetic Groups", which pinpoints precise ancestor locations to 2,114 geographic regions based on ancestral events and complements the Ethnicity Estimate. An update to the Ethnicity Estimate was originally planned for 2021 but has since been delayed.

In October 23–24, 2023, MyHeritage removed the chromosome browser and matching segment info without any statement. In October 26, MyHeritage restored functionality of the chromosome browser.

=== Photo tools ===
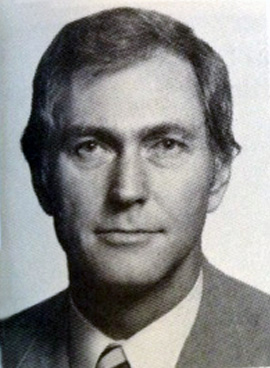
Low-resolution 270×368 pixel photograph of John Howard Lindauer, scanned from a State Legislature directory

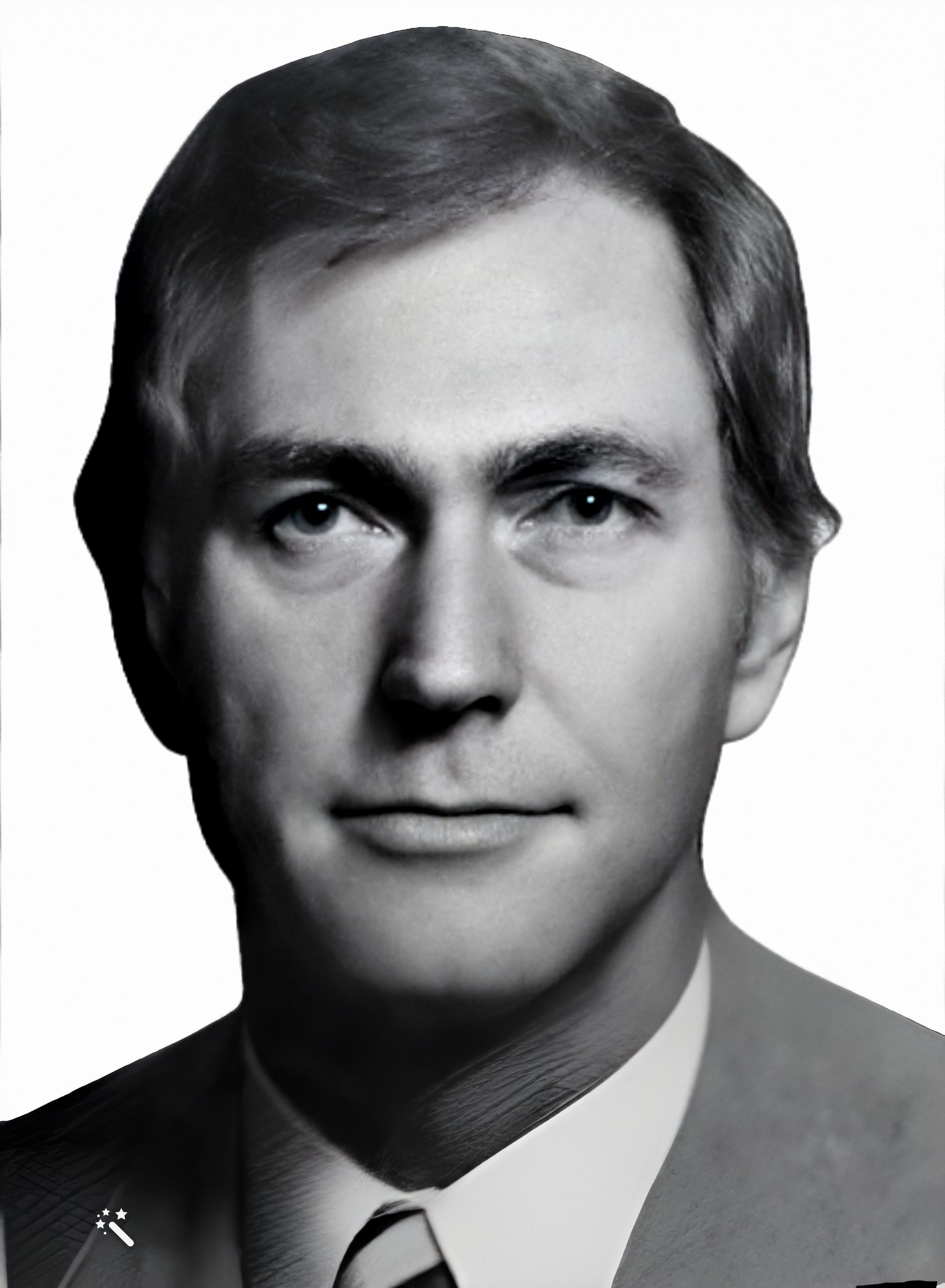
The same image processed and upscaled to 2160×2944 pixels by MyHeritage's Photo Enhancer

MyHeritage has included on its website a series of image-editing tools, offering from restoration to colorization and animation of images, with some of them using artificial intelligence, like the Photo Enhancer and MyHeritage In Color, both launched in 2020, and the Photo Repair, launched in 2021.

=== Deep Nostalgia ===
A Deep Nostalgia video clip derived from a single photo taken in 1930

Deep Nostalgia is an AI-powered service that allows users to create lifelike animations of faces in still photos. Released in February 2021, it attracted attention online, resulting in the creation of nearly 100 million animations.

=== AI Time Machine ===
MyHeritage released AI Time Machine, a feature that uses text-to-image AI technology to produce photos of a person in various time periods throughout history, as well as social cultures, in November 2022. This tool uses technology licensed from Astria, an Israeli start-up focused on customized AI image generation.

== Pro bono projects ==
=== Tribal Quest ===
The Tribal Quest Expedition project is MyHeritage's pro bono project to record the family histories of tribal peoples. It also has a program to match descendants of Holocaust survivors with property taken from their family. The project has been carried out four times, documenting Nenets people in Siberia, Himba people in Namibia, the Achuar people in Ecuador and the Karim, Yokoim and Chimbu peoples in Papua New Guinea in 2016.

=== DNA Quest ===
DNA Quest is a pro bono campaign launched by MyHeritage in 2018 with the aim of helping reunite adoptees with their biological families, donating 15,000 at-home DNA kits for this cause; this initiative was renewed in 2019, offering an additional 5,000 DNA kits and for a third time in 2023, offering an additional 5,000 DNA kits to eligible participants.

== Awards and recognition ==
In 2013, MyHeritage was selected by Globes as the most promising Israeli startup for 2013–2014. The company was ranked number one out of a possible 4,800 startups. Also in 2013, Deloitte ranked MyHeritage among the top 10 fastest-growing companies from Europe, the Middle East, and Africa (EMEA) on the Deloitte Fast 500 list.

On April 18, 2018, MyHeritage was listed in the sixth place among the list of 50 most promising startups in Israel, published by the business newspaper Calcalist.

== See also ==
- 23andMe
- Ancestry.com
- Geneanet
- Genographic Project
- WikiTree
- Geneall
