= Plant-based digital data storage =

Hypothetical storage of data in plants

Plant-based digital data storage is a futuristic view that proposes storing digital data in plants and seeds. The first practical implication showed the possibility of using plants as storage media for digital data. New approaches for data archiving are required due to the constant increase in digital data production and the lack of a capacitive, low maintenance storage medium.

== Initial experiments ==
With the help of two biotechnologists, they encoded a basic computer program in Python into Nicotiana benthamiana. They first encoded a “Hello World” computer program into a DNA code, synthesized it and cloned this coded DNA into a plasmid-vector to be used further for transformation into Nicotiana benthamiana plants. The encoded program was reconstructed from the resulting seedlings with 100% accuracy by showing “Hello World” on the computer screen. Their approach demonstrated that artificially encoded data can be stored and multiplied within plants without affecting their vigor and fertility. It also takes a step forward from storing data into a naked DNA molecule. It is inherent in progeny and authentically reproducible while the reduced metabolism of the seeds provides an additional protection for encoded DNA archives.

That was the first practical implication of utilizing a multi-cellular, eukaryotic organism for storing digital data in the world. It goes beyond plant genome manipulations for biotechnological research and plant breeding. It takes the advantage of multi-cellular organisms and serves to propagate the encoded information in daughter cells. The host organism is able to grow and multiply with the embedded information, and every cell of the organism contains a copy of the encoded information; therefore, it avoids the costs of synthetic production of multiple copies of the same encoded information. Moreover, in contrast to naked DNA, which can be affected by unfavorable environmental conditions like excessive temperature, in desiccation/re-hydration conditions, DNA stored in a seed is protected against alterations and degradation over time without the need of any active maintenance. Insertion of short computer programs into plants could also serve to provide a detailed description of a given variety, since the need for such labeling has already been expressed. As for manipulating and storing archives, their approach leverages a new look at accessing, browsing and reading information. 1g of DNA could store exabytes of data and it is a huge, capacitive storage medium. DNA protected within a seed of a living plant could be easy to access when hand-held readers will become a reality.

== See also ==
- DNA digital data storage
