= Lin He (biologist) =

Chinese American biochemist

- 何琳
- Education: Tsinghua University, Stanford Medical School, Cold Spring Harbor Laboratory
- Awards: MacArthur Fellowship
- Scientific career
- Fields: cell biology
- Workplaces: University of California, Berkeley
- Doctoral advisor: Gregory S. Barsh
- Other academic advisors: Greg Hannon

Lin He (Chinese: 何琳; pinyin: Hé Lín;) is a Chinese-American molecular biologist. She is an associate professor of cell and developmental biology at the University of California, Berkeley, in the Department of Molecular and Cell Biology, where she leads a lab focusing on identifying non-coding RNA which may play a role in tumorigenesis and tumor maintenance.

== Biography ==
Lin He grew up in Beijing. She studied in the Department of Biology of Tsinghua University. She earned a Ph.D. from Stanford Medical School, working with Gregory S. Barsh. She was a postdoctoral fellow at Cold Spring Harbor Laboratory with Greg Hannon before joining the faculty at the University of California, Berkeley.

Lin He's research focuses on the role that non-coding microRNAs play in the development and maintenance of tumors. Specifically, she has found that miR-34, a specific microRNA family, plays an essential role in blocking tumor cells from replicating in lung cancers, among others. Her current research is focused on understanding the mechanism that miR-34 plays in tumor suppression. Her lab is also studying the miR-17/92 family. Differential expression of this microRNA cluster has been observed in B-cell lymphomas, suggesting that miR-17/92 members are potential human oncogenes. Her work has appeared in Nature, Nature Genetics, Celland Science.

== Awards ==
Lin He received the prestigious MacArthur Fellowship in 2009, was selected as a HHMI faculty scholar in 2016 and appointed as a Biohub investigator in 2022.
