= Emily Bernstein =

American medical professor

- Education: State University of New York at Stony Brook
- Scientific career
- Workplaces: Mount Sinai College of Medicine
- Thesis: Dicer, a novel RNase III, is required for RNA interference and development (2003)
- Doctoral advisor: Gregory Hannon

Emily Bernstein is a professor at Mount Sinai School of Medicine known for her research on RNA interference, epigenetics, and cancer, especially melanoma.

== Education and career ==
Bernstein received her B.S. from McGill University in 1998 and earned a Ph.D. from Stony Brook University in 2003. Following her Ph.D. she was a postdoctoral researcher at Rockefeller University where she worked with David Allis. In 2008 she moved to Mount Sinai School of Medicine where, as of 2022, she is a professor in the department of oncology and dermatology.

== Research ==
Bernstein is known for her research on RNA interference, epigenetics, and cell development. Her early research examined the enzyme Dicer, its role in cell development in mice, and RNA interference. While a postdoctoral researcher she examined linkages between non-coding RNA and chromatin and DNA methylation. Subsequently, she has worked on histones, gene silencing, and tumor cell development. In 2022 her team discovered alterations to a gene which can lead to melanoma.

== Selected publications ==
- Bernstein, Emily; Caudy, Amy A.; Hammond, Scott M.; Hannon, Gregory J. (2001). "Role for a bidentate ribonuclease in the initiation step of RNA interference". Nature. 409 (6818): 363–366. doi:10.1038/35053110. ISSN 0028-0836. PMID 11201747. S2CID 4371481.
- Hammond, Scott M.; Bernstein, Emily; Beach, David; Hannon, Gregory J. (2000). "An RNA-directed nuclease mediates post-transcriptional gene silencing in Drosophila cells". Nature. 404 (6775): 293–296. Bibcode:2000Natur.404..293H. doi:10.1038/35005107. ISSN 0028-0836. PMID 10749213. S2CID 9091863.
- Goldberg, Aaron D.; Allis, C. David; Bernstein, Emily (2007-02-23). "Epigenetics: A Landscape Takes Shape". Cell. 128 (4): 635–638. doi:10.1016/j.cell.2007.02.006. ISSN 0092-8674. PMID 17320500. S2CID 16604496.
- Bernstein, Emily; Kim, Sang Yong; Carmell, Michelle A; Murchison, Elizabeth P; Alcorn, Heather; Li, Mamie Z; Mills, Alea A; Elledge, Stephen J; Anderson, Kathryn V; Hannon, Gregory J (2003-11-01). "Dicer is essential for mouse development". Nature Genetics. 35 (3): 215–217. doi:10.1038/ng1253. ISSN 1061-4036. PMID 14528307. S2CID 972721.

== Awards and honors ==
In 2014 Bernstein received a young investigators award from the Pershing Square Foundation.
