= Gilad Japhet =

Israeli entrepreneur and genealogist (born 1969)

- גלעד יפת
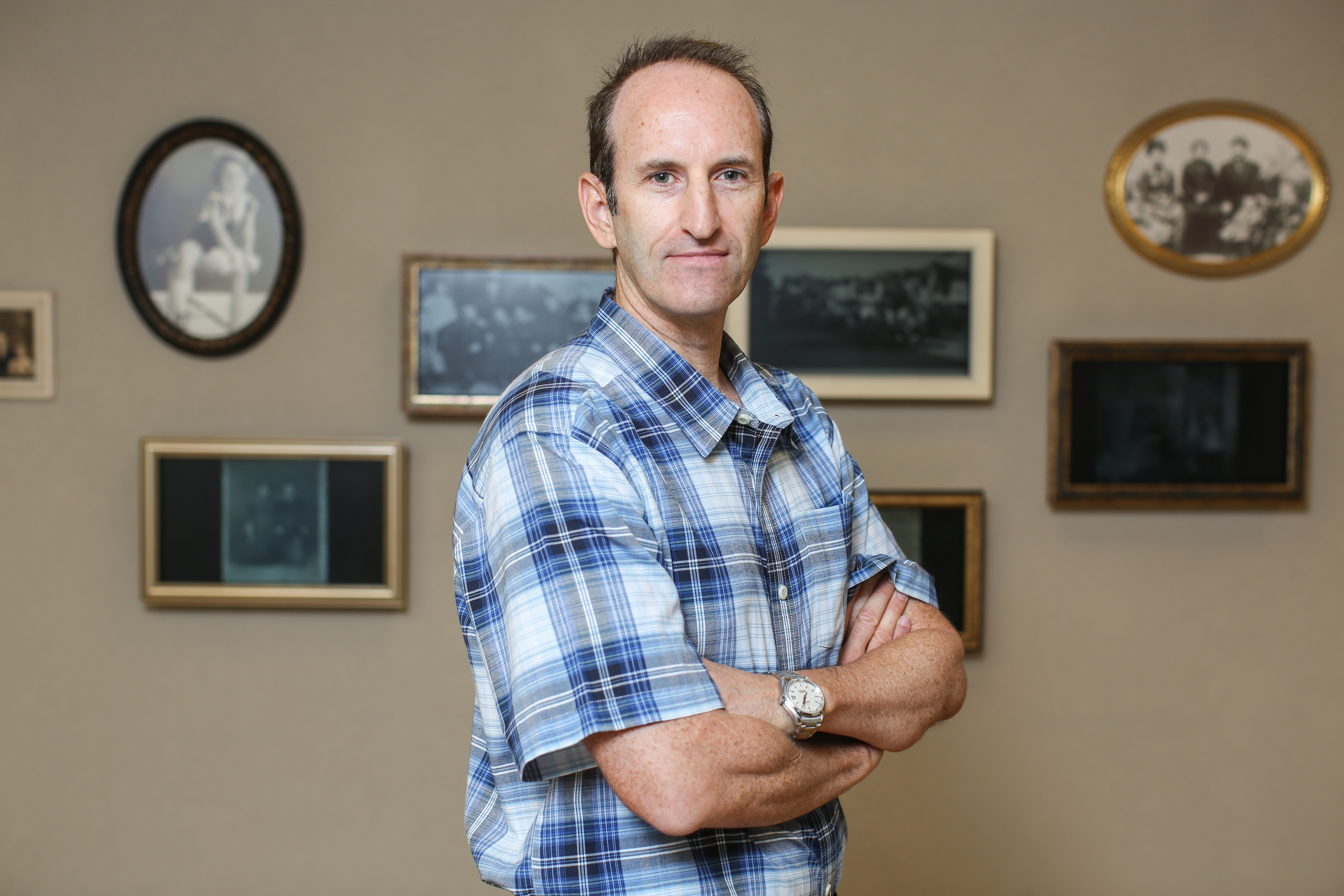
- Born: December 19, 1969 (age 56); Jerusalem, Israel
- Education: BSc Software Engineering, Technion 1996
- Occupations: cyber security; entrepreneur
- Known for: CEO of MyHeritage
- Children: 3
- Mother: Sara Japhet

Gilad Japhet (Hebrew: גלעד יפת; born December 19, 1969) is an Israeli entrepreneur and genealogist. He is the founder and CEO of MyHeritage, a high-tech company that has developed a platform for preserving family history and creating family trees. It also offers DNA testing.

== Biography ==
Gilad Japhet was born in Jerusalem to Gideon Japhet, an attorney, and Sara Japhet, who won the 2004 Israel Prize in recognition of her contribution to Biblical studies. Japhet has three sisters. His sister Shlomit Japhet-Bialik is the author of a travel guide series, "The Traveling Family". The family is directly descended from a line of distinguished rabbis, including Alexander Süsskind of Grodno, Eliezer Simcha Rabinowitz and Binyamin Diskin. His grandfather, Chaim Japhet, was a member of the pre-state Jewish National Council, the deputy of Henrietta Szold and one of the pioneers of social work in Israel. Japhet studied at the Hebrew University High School in Jerusalem. In 1984, he moved with his family to Oxford, England, where his mother was a visiting fellow. There Japhet became interested in personal computers, a field which was gaining momentum in those years. On his return to Israel, he established one of Israel's first computer programming groups on the Sinclair Spectrum computer, naming it "The Israeli Team."

From 1988 to 1992, Japhet served in the Israel Defense Forces as a technology officer. From 1992 to 1996, he studied software engineering at the Technion, and completed his BSc summa cum laude.

Japhet is married and the father of three. As of 2010s he lives in Moshav Bnei Atarot in Israel.

== Technology career ==
During his university studies, Japhet worked full-time at BRM Technologies as head of the computer virus analysis team (the product was later sold to Norton). His manager at BRM was Nir Barkat, who was later elected mayor of Jerusalem. Japhet's work included analyzing computer viruses and creating algorithms for their detection and removal. Japhet was a member of CARO – an organization of anti-virus experts. Among his inventions was a new virus detection and classification system based on the similarity of code segments which significantly reduced the development time needed to detect and remove new viruses. In 1996–2000, Japhet worked for BackWeb Technologies, an intra-organizational communications technology company. As product manager, he moved to Silicon Valley and contributed to the company's IPO on NASDAQ. At that point, Japhet took a six-month career break to research his family history, traveling around the world to interview relatives. He then worked for Spearhead Technologies and Picatel Systems in product management positions, during 2001–2002.

== MyHeritage ==
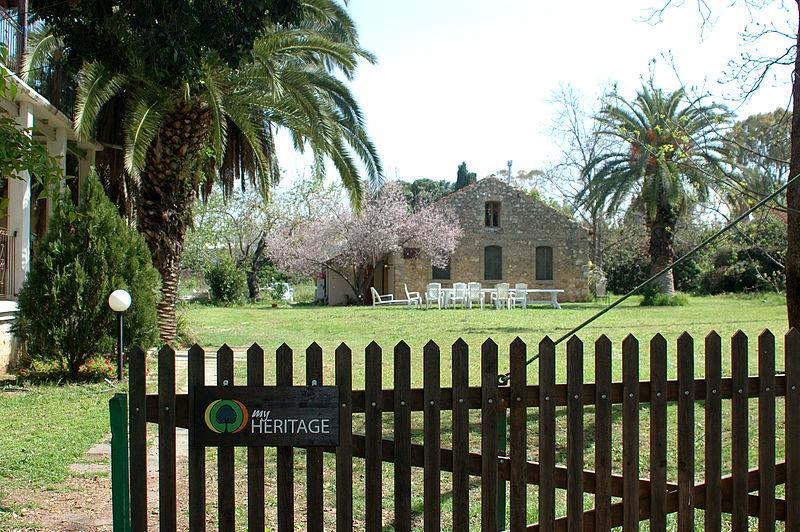
First MyHeritage office, Bnei Atarot

Japhet became interested in family history in the wake of a school project at the age of 13. After interviewing his mother, genealogy became his hobby. In 2003, he created a simple software for family trees that became the basis of MyHeritage, a platform for building multi-lingual family trees. Based on software he created for his own use, he decided to launch a start-up focused on genealogy. The company, eventually named MyHeritage, started out in his home in Moshav Bnei Atarot near Tel Aviv. As the number of employees grew, it moved to other premises in the moshav. Since 2012, MyHeritage has been headquartered in Or Yehuda. The company uses a wide range of technologies to assist family history research, including face detection, semantic analysis, and DNA testing. MyHeritage's database of more than 9 billion records continues to grow and increase public awareness of genealogy. MyHeritage offers free tools for creating family trees, thereby making genealogical research accessible to the general population. The website has over 40 million family trees in 42 languages. At the end of 2016, the company launched a genetic DNA testing service with home kits. In 2017, the company reported record revenues of $133 million. On Israel's 70th Independence Day, the company was chosen for inclusion in the book Inventing Every Morning Anew, which lists the 70 most prominent inventions and innovations in the history of the state.

== Volunteering and philanthropic projects ==
=== Restitution of looted property ===
In 2013–2014, Japhet initiated and implemented a pro bono project for the restitution of Holocaust victims' property in East Germany after a reporter for an online newspaper, Ofer Aderet, revealed that there was a deadline for applying for compensation for assets stolen by the Nazis, and descendants would not be able to file claims after a certain date. That same day, Japhet conducted genealogical research in which he managed to locate the great-granddaughter of one of the victims on the list. The woman, who lives in Brazil, was informed of her right to claim the property. With the help of this project, many descendants of Jews murdered in the Holocaust were able to appeal to receive restitution for their property.

Doreen Carvajal, a reporter for The New York Times in Paris, heard about this work and invited Japhet to cooperate with her in locating heirs, mostly Holocaust victims, whose artworks were stolen by the Nazis during World War II. Carvajal sent Japhet the names of four Jews listed in the MNR (National Museums Restitution) database of stolen art compiled by Rose Valland. Through Japhet's genealogical research, the heirs of all four were located. She published a story about it in the New York Times that caused a stir and encouraged the French authorities to invest greater effort in locating heirs.

=== Digitizing cemeteries ===
In 2014, Japhet initiated a national project to photograph all the graves in the State of Israel, transcribe the information on the tombstones, and publish photographs of the graves, to make them accessible to the public free of charge. As part of this project, Japhet recruited a team of 120 volunteers, half of them MyHeritage employees, to photograph the gravestones in Holon Cemetery, Israel's largest burial grounds, for genealogical documentation. Within a few hours, pictures were taken of 150,000 gravestones, two-thirds of the total. In the pilot for the project, 75,000 graves were photographed at Segula, a smaller cemetery in Petah Tikva.

=== Family reunification ===
In 2016, Japhet established a DNA database to contribute to the reunification of Yemenite, North African, and other families that were split up under mysterious circumstances in the early days of the state, an episode known as Yemenite Children Affair. The initiative was launched in cooperation with the Knesset Lobby on Yemenite Children headed by MK Nurit Koren.

=== DNA Quest ===
In a pro bono initiative in 2018, conceived by Japhet, MyHeritage announced it would provide 15,000 free DNA testing kits to individuals searching for their birth families and family members given up for adoption. The company currently charges $79 per kit, which contains cheek swabs.

=== Chess competitions ===
Japhet is the organizer and sponsor of the Gideon Japhet Memorial Open Chess Tournament, an annual international competition dedicated to the memory of his father, Gideon Japhet, who was an avid chess and sports enthusiast. The competition attracts hundreds of chess players from Israel and around the world, and has been described as one of the strongest open chess tournaments in Israel.

== Awards and recognition ==
In 2011, Sarah Lacy devoted a chapter in her book, Brilliant, Crazy, Cocky, to Japhet, as one of the most influential global entrepreneurs outside the United States. In 2014, he was included on the list of 36 "uberpreneurs" compiled by Peter Andrews and Fiona Wood, who the authors believe are transforming society. Japhet's achievements are documented in Robert Hisrich's book Advanced Introduction to Entrepreneurship Japhet plays himself in the role of a DNA and genealogy expert in Aviv Talmor's 2014 documentary film I am Bialik.

== See also ==
- Start-up Nation
- Israeli Chess Championship
