= Crystallography (book) =

1994 book of poetry and prose

Crystallography is a book of poetry and prose published in 1994 and revised in 2003 by Canadian author Christian Bök. Based around a pataphysical conceit that language is a crystallization process, the book includes several forms of poetry including concrete poetry, as well as pseudohistorical texts, diagrams, charts, and English gematria.

Major poems in the book include Geodes and Diamonds.

Bök explains the title in an introduction. Crystallography refers to both the science of crystallography and a reanalysis of the word's roots: crystal meaning "clear", and "graph" meaning "writing":

Inspired by the etymology of the word "crystallography". such a work represents an act of lucid writing, which uses the language of geological science to misread the poetics of rhetorical language. Such lucid writing does not concern itself with the transparent transmission of a message (so that, ironically, the poetry often seems "opaque"); instead, lucid writing concerns itself with the exploratory examination of its own pattern (in a manner reminiscent of lucid dreaming). (Bök, 2003)
