= Christian Bök =

Canadian poet

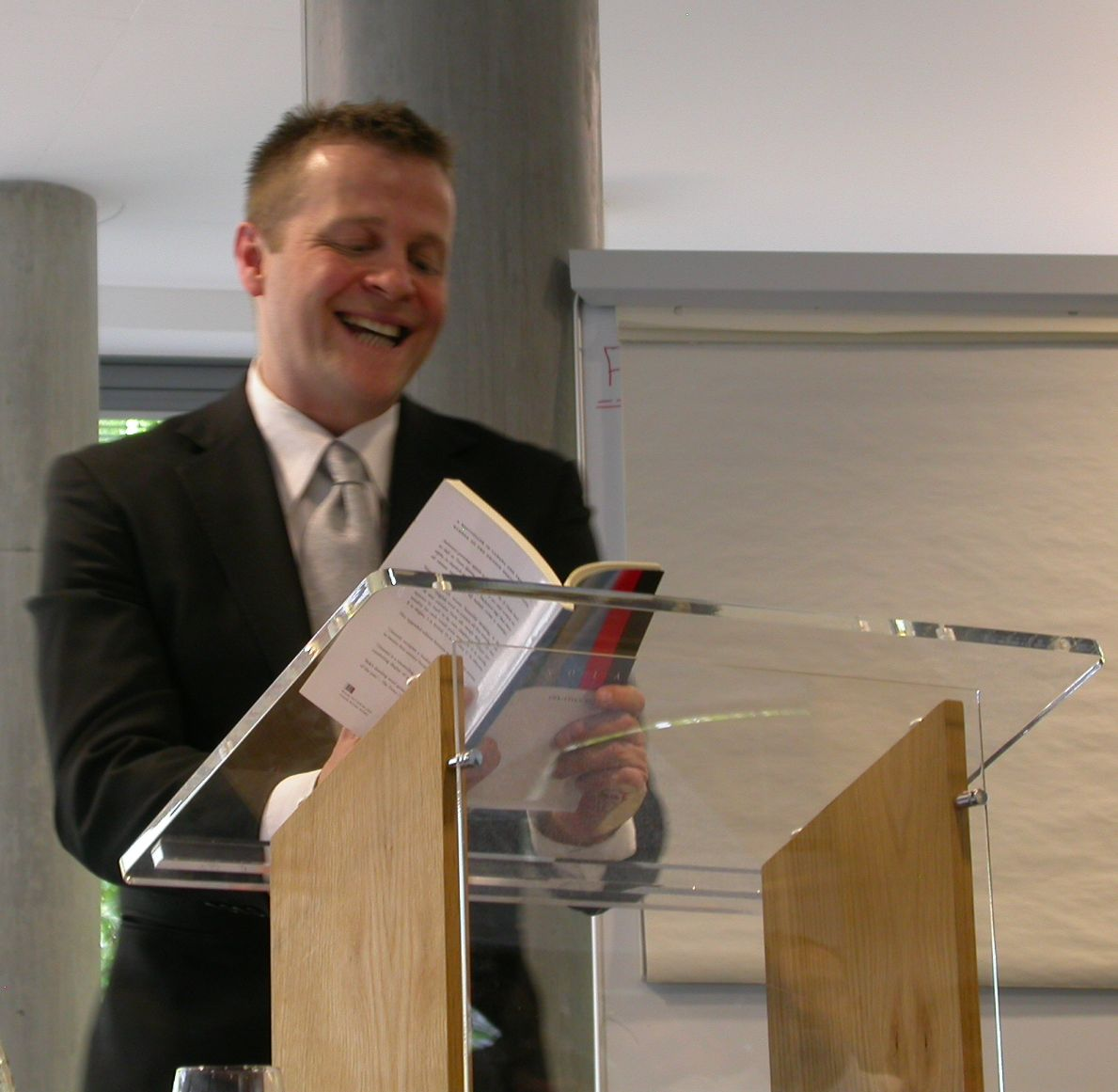
- Bök reading from Eunoia at the University of York on May 19, 2011
- Born: Christian Book; August 10, 1966 (age 60); Toronto
- Education: Carleton University; York University
- Occupation: Poet
- Writing career
- Notable works: Eunoia; Crystallography; The Xenotext
- Notable awards: Griffin Poetry Prize 2002

Christian Bök, FRSC (/bʊk/; born August 10, 1966, in Toronto, Canada) is a Canadian poet known for his experimental works. He is the author of Eunoia, which won the Canadian Griffin Poetry Prize.

== Life and work ==
He was born "Christian Book", but uses "Bök" as a pseudonym.

He began writing seriously in his early twenties, while earning his B.A. and M.A. degrees at Carleton University in Ottawa. He returned to Toronto in the early 1990s to study for a Ph.D. in English literature at York University, where he encountered a burgeoning literary community that included Steve McCaffery, Christopher Dewdney, and Darren Wershler. From 2004, he taught at the University of Calgary, moving to Australia in 2022, where he worked as an artist in Melbourne, Australia, and he served as a Professor (Honorary Appointee) at Charles Darwin University in Darwin, Australia. Bök is currently Professor of Fine Art at Leeds Beckett University, UK, working within the School of Arts and the Leeds Arts Research Centre.

In 1994, Bök published Crystallography, "a pataphysical encyclopaedia that misreads the language of poetics through the conceits of geology." The Village Voice said of it: "Bök's concise reflections on mirrors, fractals, stones, and ice diabolically change the way you think about language — his, yours — so that what begins as description suddenly seems indistinguishable from the thing itself." Crystallography was reissued in 2003 and was nominated for a Gerald Lampert Award.

Bök is a sound poet, who has performed an extremely condensed version of the "Ursonate" by Kurt Schwitters. He has created conceptual art, making artist's books from Rubik's Cubes and Lego bricks. He has also worked in science-fiction television by constructing artificial languages for Gene Roddenberry's Earth: Final Conflict and Peter Benchley's Amazon.

=== Eunoia ===
Bök is most famous for writing Eunoia (2001), a book that took him seven years to finish. Eunoia consists of univocalic lipograms. The book uses only one vowel in each of its five chapters. In the book's main part, each chapter uses just a single vowel, producing sentences such as this: "Enfettered, these sentences repress free speech." Bök believes that "his book proves that each vowel has its own personality."

Edited by Darren Wershler and published by Coach House Books in 2001, Eunoia won the 2002 Griffin Poetry Prize and sold more than 20,000 copies. Canongate published "Eunoia" in Britain in October 2008. The book was also a bestseller there, reaching #8 on the Top 10 bestselling charts for the year.

=== The Xenotext ===
The Xenotext is an ongoing work of BioArt which claims to be "the first example of 'living poetry.'" The Xenotext consists of a single sonnet (called "Orpheus"), which gets translated into a gene and then integrated into a cell, causing the cell to "read" this poem, and in reply, the cell builds a protein — one whose sequence of amino acids encodes yet another sonnet (called "Eurydice"). The cell becomes not only a durable archive for storing a poem, but also an operant machine for writing a poem. The gene has so far worked properly in cultures of E. coli, but the intended symbiote is D. radiodurans ("the dire seed, immune to radiation") — an extremophile, able to thrive in very inhospitable environments, deadly to most life on Earth.

According to Bök from an interview in 2007, the final product will include:

a poetic manual that showcases the text of the poem, followed by an artfully designed monograph about the experiment, including, for example, the chemical alphabet for the cipher, the genetic sequence for the poetry, the schematics for the protein, and even a photograph of the microbe, complete with other apparati, such as charts, graphs, images, and essays, all outlining our results.

Bök has collaborated with laboratories at the University of Calgary, the University of Wyoming, and the University of Texas (Austin), to realize his design. In 2011, nine years after conceiving The Xenotext, Bök announced that labs had performed a successful test run of his "poetic cipher," meaning that:

when implanted in the genome of [the] bacterium, [the] poem (which begins 'any style of life/ is prim…') does in fact cause the bacterium to write, in response, its own poem (which begins 'the faery is rosy/ of glow…').

In 2015, The Xenotext: Book 1 was published — a work consisting of meditations on both science and poetics (addressing their mythic drives for immortality). This first, "Orphic" volume sets the conceptual groundwork for the second, "Eurydicean" volume, which will document the experiment itself. The Xenotext: Book 2 was published in 2025.

=== The Kazimir Effect ===
In 2021, Bök published The Kazimir Effect (Penteract Press, 2021), listed as one of the Times Literary Supplement's Books of the Year 2021. This arose from a visual poetry project that begin in 2017, inspired by Suprematist Composition: White on White by Kazimir Malevich.

== Recognition ==
Eunoia won the Griffin Poetry Prize in 2002.

Bök's poem "Vowels" was used in the lyrics of a song on the EP A Quick Fix of Melancholy (2003) by the Norwegian band Ulver.

In 2006, Christian Bök and his work were the subject of an episode of the television series Heart of a Poet, produced by Canadian filmmaker Maureen Judge.

On May 31, 2011, The BBC World Service broadcast Bök reading "The Xenotext."

== Bibliography ==
- Crystallography (Coach House, 1994) ISBN 978-1-55245-119-9
- Eunoia (Coach House, 2001; 2nd edition, 2009) ISBN 1-55245-092-9 - winner of the 2002 Canadian Griffin Poetry Prize
- 'Pataphysics: The Poetics of an Imaginary Science (Northwestern University Press, 2001) ISBN 978-0-8101-1876-8
- The Xenotext: Book 1 (Coach House, 2015) ISBN 978-1-55245-321-6
- The Kazimir Effect (Penteract Press, 2021) ISBN 978-1-913421-11-3
- My Works, Ye Mighty (Athabasca University Press, 2025)
- The Xenotext: Book 2 (Coach House, 2025)

As editor

- Ground Works: Avante-Garde for Thee (2003) ISBN 978-0-88784-180-4

Included in

- Poetry Plastique (2001) ISBN 978-1-887123-51-8
- The Griffin Poetry Prize Anthology : A Selection of the 2002 Shortlist (2002) ISBN 978-0-88784-676-2

== See also ==
- List of Canadian poets
- Concrete poetry
- Sound poetry
- The Xenotext
