= Mikhail Samoilovich Neiman =

Soviet Physicist

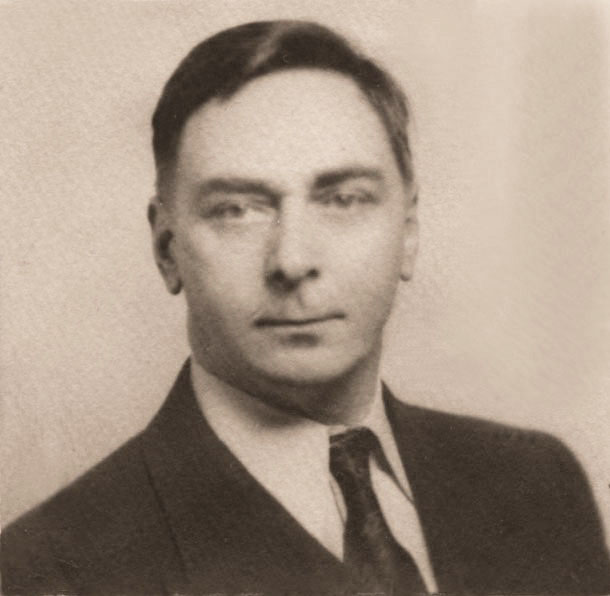
- Born: 7 March 1905; Sevastopol, Russian Empire
- Died: 25 June 1975 (aged 70); Moscow, USSR
- Occupation: Physicist

Mikhail Samoilovich Neiman (March 7, 1905, in Sevastopol, Russian Empire – June 25, 1975, in Moscow, USSR) was a Soviet physicist, Doctor of Technical Sciences and professor. The main directions of his research were the study of the ultra-high frequency electromagnetic systems, theoretical and applied radio engineering, and automatic processes.

== Life ==
Neiman was born in Sevastopol in the family of Crimean Karaites. His father was an employee and his parents were also engaged in gardening. In 1922 Mikhail Neiman graduated from Simferopol general education college, and in 1928 from the Physics and Mechanics faculty of the Leningrad Polytechnic Institute with specialty "Radio engineering" and qualification "engineer-physicist."

In 1926, being a student, he joined the Central Radio Laboratory (CRL) of the National Trust of electrical plants of the weak current. Here he began (and continued to 1941) his scientific and engineering activities in the field of short-wave transmitters. He also taught at the Leningrad State University, Leningrad Polytechnic Institute, and in 1938 became the head of the Department of Theoretical Radio Engineering at the Leningrad Electrotechnical Institute (LETI). In 1939 Neiman defended his doctoral thesis in the field of closed oscillating electromagnetic systems, and was confirmed in the rank of professor.

In February 1941, Neiman in a group of experts was sent on an assignment by People's Commissariat of Electrical Industry to the United States under a technical assistance contract with a leading radio company RCA. Shortly after the start of the war between Germany and the USSR (June 22, 1941) the "Government Purchasing Commission of the USSR in the USA" was organized to implement Lend-Lease. Among many other Soviet specialists, Neiman was employed there for the whole duration of the war. He was deputy chief of communications department.

From 1946 to 1974, Neiman headed the Department of radio transmitters and antenna-feeder devices at the Radio Electronics Faculty, Moscow Aviation Institute (MAI).

Neiman was one of the organizers of the Radio Electronics Faculty, the chairman of its Scientific Council with the duties of the scientific supervisor of the faculty and the member of the Scientific Council of the MAI. With his active participation curricula and programs of the faculty were developed, "radio engineer" qualification for graduates was established. His textbook in two parts, "The course of transmitting devices" was published in 1957–1958. This book and his tutorials were fundamental and intelligible at the same time. Under his supervising 6 doctoral and 20 PhD theses were produced. At the department headed by Neiman research in the field of radio transmitters and antenna systems was conducted. He headed the department "Ultra-high frequencies Technology" of the laboratory at the Radio Faculty.

Since 1946, Neiman worked also at the Central Scientific Research Institute of Radio Engineering (CNIRTI, former Scientific Research Institute-108). Under his leadership a number of research and development works were made: new methods for the generation, transmission and reception of microwave signals, the production of large capacities in the centimeter and decimeter ranges, constructive design of disk klystron and others. Neiman was the member of the CNIRTI Scientific Council.

Neiman died on June 25, 1975, in Moscow. In one of the buildings of the Moscow Aviation Institute in his memory a memorial plaque is set.

In 1995 the Moscow Aviation Institute held a meeting devoted to the 90th anniversary of the birth of Neiman. Speeches of staff and his pupils revealed great respect for his research and teaching, to his personality. Many people noted that he was inspired by him, and he serves as the guide for their work and life.

In 2005 the Aircraft Radio Electronics Faculty at the MAI held a conference of young scientists, PhD students and students dedicated to the 100th anniversary of the birth of Neiman.

== Scientific work and achievements ==
Neiman made the significant contribution to the development of many areas of radioelectronics. In 1920-1930-s under his leadership and with his participation transmitters of different power and range, and also antenna-feeder systems for different ranges for the greatest Soviet shortwave broadcasting centers were developed. He developed methods of regulating the phase velocity of propagation of electromagnetic waves along the antenna wire, which have found wide application in the later traveling wave tubes of UHF and SHF bands, as well as a surface wave antennas. He published the monograph "The transmitting antennas", which for a long time served as a guide for the design of these antennas and was used as the textbook. He created a general theory of frequency stabilization, developed a theory of calculation of passive vibrators. He conducted the study of the phenomenon of flare expiration of the antenna wire, the results of it were used in the design of antennas and super-powerful Soviet shortwave radios. He created the general theory of receive antennas based on an electrodynamic principle of reciprocity, and it became conventional in radio engineering. He carried out a number of theoretical and experimental studies of band antennae (in-phase and rhombic), developed the theory of rhombic antennas, invented two advanced systems of rhombic antennas. Also developed the theory of inhomogeneous lines with impedance that varies exponentially. Proposed and developed a general theory and methods of calculation of closed oscillating electromagnetic devices, later known as the "volume resonators", which are the basis of many systems of UHF and SHF bands. He developed a new type of antenna - diffraction antenna (one of its species is slot antenna). Also proposed the theory and method of preparation of the traveling wave along the wire without loss of power. He formulated the general requirements and principles of the building of broadband antennas, discovered and described the phenomenon known as "feeder echo." Together with A.A. Pistolkors he developed the theory of a direct measurement of the traveling wave in the feeders and created the appropriate measuring devices, so called "feeder reflectometers".

In the late 1940s, Neiman developed the theory of electronic modes of triode and tetrode generators at high angles of electron span and large vibration amplitudes. His monograph "Triode and tetrode microwave frequency generators" was awarded the Stalin Prize of the 3rd degree in 1952 and published also in German and Chinese.

In the 1950s and 1960s, Neiman proposed the new principle for broadband antennas free from the reflection phenomena and called "antennas of smooth radiation", and also the new method of calculating the power and radiation resistance of metallic antennas based on the calculation of emission of electrons moving in metal. He generalized the theory of contours and lines on the vibrational, channelizing and emitting electromagnetic microwave systems, which became the basis for the design of a wide class of microwave systems (monograph "A generalization of the theory of chains on the wave systems"). He developed the theory of transverse joints in waveguide systems, proposed a number of methods for design and analysis of triode, tetrode, pentode, klystron, platinotron, magnetron and reznatron amplifiers and oscillators, carried out studies of surface electromagnetic waves. In the book "Automatic processes and phenomena" he proposed a number of original provisions of the general theory of automatic processes. Also conducted several studies in the field of computer science: explored theoretical issues of radiopulse fast discrete automation systems, stated principal considerations for the automation of research, automation of programming of ultrafast computing systems.

In 1964-65, Neiman published original ideas and principal considerations of radical miniaturization on elements for recording, storing and retrieving of digital information to the molecular-atomic level, including the use of structures similar to DNA molecules. Similar ideas were also expressed by the American scientists R.F. Feynman and N. Wiener. Practical applications of using artificial DNA to store large amounts of information appeared only in the late 20th - early 21st century (see DNA digital data storage for more details).

In 1966-67, Neiman generalized negentropy principle of information to digital data processing systems, and defined the relation restrictions between their speed and energy level of the functioning of their elements. He made a number of fundamental assumptions of the theory of extracting information from the objective processes, identified the cause of her contradictions and paradoxes. Also he worked on the history and prospects of development of radioelectronics.

Neiman published over 90 scientific papers, including six books and textbook for higher school, which was released in two editions. For fruitful scientific, pedagogical and social activities, Neiman was awarded the Order "Badge of Honor" (1953) and three medals, in 1962 he was awarded the title "Honored Personality of Science and Technics of the Russian Soviet Federative Socialist Republic".

== Bibliography ==
- Granovskaya, R.A.; Ruslanov, V.I. (2005). "Professor M.S. Neiman: name in the history of radio electronics and the Moscow Aviation Institute. On the 100th anniversary of his birth.". House "World of History" (in Russian).
- "Mikhail Samoilovich Neiman (on the 100th anniversary of his birth)". Radiotekhnika (in Russian). No. 12. 2005. pp. 83–84.
- "Mikhail Samoilovich Neiman". Virtual Computer Museum (in Russian).
- Rebrova, I.M.; Rebrova, O.Yu (2006). "Professor M.S. Neiman". Telecommunications: Past and Present (in Russian). No. 2. pp. 10–18.
- "Neiman M.S. The first decade of work (1926–1935). Memories.". House "World of History" (in Russian). 2005.
- "A conference of young scientists, graduate students and students dedicated to the 100th anniversary of the birth of Professor, Doctor of Technical Sciences Mikhail Samoilovich Neiman, 17–18 March 2005". Antennas (in Russian). Vol. 103, no. 12. 2005. pp. 42–49.
