= Gregory Hannon =

British molecular cancer biologist (1964–2026)

Greg Hannon FRS FMedSci
- Born: Gregory James Hannon; 5 May 1964
- Died: 4 April 2026 (aged 61)
- Education: Case Western Reserve University (BA, PhD)
- Awards: EMBO Member (2018); Royal Society Wolfson Research Merit Award (2015)
- Scientific career
- Fields: non-coding RNA; Genetics; Molecular biology; Genomics; Cancer
- Workplaces: University of Cambridge; New York Genome Center; Cold Spring Harbor Laboratory; Howard Hughes Medical Institute
- Thesis: Trans-splicing of nematode pre-messenger RNA (1992)
- Doctoral advisor: Timothy W. Nilsen
- Doctoral students: Emily Bernstein; Yaniv Erlich
- Other notable students: Lin He (postdoc)
- Website: hannonlab.org

Gregory James Hannon (5 May 1964 – 4 April 2026) was a professor of molecular cancer biology and director of the Cancer Research UK Cambridge Institute at the University of Cambridge. He was a Fellow of Trinity College, Cambridge while also serving as a director of cancer genomics at the New York Genome Center and an adjunct professor at Cold Spring Harbor Laboratory.

== Career and research ==
Hannon was known for his contributions to small RNA biology, cancer biology, and mammalian genomics. He had a role in the discovery of oncogenes, beginning with work that led to the identification of CDK inhibitors and their links to cancer. More recently, his work focused on small RNA biology, which led to an understanding of the biochemical mechanisms and biological functions of RNA interference (RNAi). He developed widely used tools and strategies for manipulation of gene expression in mammalian cells and animals and generated genome-wide short hairpin RNA (shRNA) libraries that are available to the cancer community; he was among the first to demonstrate roles for microRNAs in cancer. His laboratory also discovered the piwi-interacting RNA (piRNA) pathway and linked this to transposon repression and the protection of germ cell genomes. His innovations included the development of selective re-sequencing strategies, broadly termed exome capture.

In 2017, Hannon was awarded a £20 million Cancer Grand Challenges award to unite the IMAXT team - a team of researchers from Switzerland, Ireland, Canada, the USA and the UK, with far ranging expertise from cancer biology and pathology to astronomy and even VR video game design. The team's aim is to create an interactive 3D map of cancer, which could be explored in virtual reality. The programme could transform the way researchers study cancer by providing unprecedented insight into how individual cells are arranged and how they interact to allow the tumour to grow.

In 2018, it was announced Hannon would guide the Functional Genomics Centre, a collaboration between Cancer Research UK and AstraZeneca. The centre, housed inside the Milner Therapeutics Institute, aims to act as a hub for genetic screens, cancer models, CRISPR tool design, and computational approaches to big data to understand genetic changes in cancer development and identify potential drug targets.

== Awards and honours ==
- Pew Scholar in the Biomedical Sciences, 1997
- Rita Allen Scholar, 2000
- US Army Breast Cancer Research Programme Innovator Award, 2002
- AACR Award for Outstanding Achievement in Cancer Research, 2005
- National Academy of Sciences Award in Molecular Biology, 2007
- Memorial Sloan-Kettering Cancer Center Paul Marks Prize for Cancer Research, 2007
- National Academy of Sciences Member, 2012
- Royal Society Wolfson Professorship, 2015
- Academy of Medical Sciences member, 2017
- EMBO member, 2018
- The Royal Society Fellow, 2018
- European Academy of Cancer Sciences Fellow, 2019
- Fellow of the American Association for Cancer Research Academy, 2020
