= Geneall =

Portuguese public genealogy database

- Screenshot
- Company type: Nonprofit
- Website type: Genealogy Database
- Available in: English; Portuguese; Spanish; French; German; Italian
- Headquarters: Lisbon, Portugal
- Owner: Luís Amaral
- Creator: Luís Amaral (founder)
- Website: geneall.net
- Commercial: No
- Registration: Optional (required to access most information)
- Launched: 2000; 26 years ago
- Current status: Active
- Content license: CC-BY-SA

Geneall.net is a Portuguese public internet database on family history and genealogy, mainly concerning Royalty and Aristocracy around the world. It is a collaborative effort by a small group of expert genealogists in Lisbon, with over 3 million individuals (living and deceased) and 177,000 family names in the database. For many of those individuals, there is a corresponding subpage displaying an ancestry chart. It is the largest Portuguese-language internet database concentrating on genealogy, but it is not restricted to Portuguese, offering five other languages.

Geneall uses a nobility pedigree structure which arranges individuals into descendants of five historic European sovereigns; namely Ferdinand I of Castile and León, William the Conqueror, Hugh Capet, Charlemagne and Afonso I of Portugal.

The site comprises historical and contemporary influential people primarily, such as monarchs, nobles, distinguished statesmen and eminent artists, as well as their descendants.

Although the information displayed on the site is strictly added and revised by the Geneall employees, users are allowed to send potential corrections based on reliable sources through a form sent directly within the site.

Since late 2016, and as a result of an attempt to raise funds for the maintenance of the database, most of the features that were once open to the general public have been closed and now require a paid membership to access.

== History ==
The site was created in 2000. Initially, it was called Genea Portugal and was hosted as a portal in SAPO. It originated from the database created when Luís Amaral started a collaboration with the newspaper O Independente at the request of the then director Paulo Portas. The collaboration consisted of the drafting of a supplement of genealogical collectibles for the newspaper. The supplement, called "Names of Portugal" (from January to June 1998) had 26 weekly issues with 24 pages, with information on about 80 Portuguese family names.

As of January 2018, the database had information on more than 3 million people and 177,000 family names.

== Characteristics ==
=== Circle system ===
Some individuals in the database have their name succeeded by a coloured circle that defines them as descendants of the different kinds that constitute a reference for the corresponding nationality. This principle applies to all sites, and thus:

- A green circle identifies the descendants of Ferdinand I, King of Castile and León (Spanish monarch)
- A yellow circle identifies the descendants of Charlemagne, Holy Roman Emperor (French/German monarch)
- A dark blue circle identifies the descendants of Hugh Capet, King of the Franks (French monarch)
- A red circle identifies the descendants of William the Conqueror, King of England (English monarch)
- A light blue circle identifies the descendants of Afonso I Henriques (Portuguese monarch)

All 5 circles can be possessed by an individual at once, designating him as a descendant of all the main medieval monarchs of Western Europe.

=== Notability & sources ===
Even though Geneall does not have any notability requirements for the people listed, it does mainly concentrate on prominent families (including the nobility of France, Germany, Portugal, Spain and Britain) and people (such as the ancestry of every president of the major western countries) as well as trivia facts (people's profession, titles etc.).

Geneall's research is based upon the Genealogical works published throughout history and the private investigations undergone by Geneall's employees.
