= Nick Goldman =

- Born: Nicholas Goldman
- Education: University of Cambridge
- Known for: DNA digital data storage Evolutionary genetics
- Awards: Wellcome Trust Senior Fellow (1995–2006)
- Scientific career
- Fields: Bioinformatics
- Institutions: European Bioinformatics Institute
- Thesis: Statistical estimation of evolutionary trees (1991)

Nicholas Goldman is a group leader and senior scientist at the European Bioinformatics Institute (EBI), located on the Wellcome Genome Campus in Hinxton, Cambridgeshire, England. He began working at the EBI in 2002, and became a senior scientist there in 2009. His group's research focuses on evolutionary genetics and genomics. He and his EBI colleague Ewan Birney, along with other researchers, developed a tool for DNA digital data storage, on which they successfully encoded all the sonnets of William Shakespeare, Martin Luther King Jr.'s 1963 "I Have a Dream" speech, a PDF of the 1953 paper "Molecular Structure of Nucleic Acids: A Structure for Deoxyribose Nucleic Acid", and a photo of their own institute. They described their results in a 2013 paper in Nature.
