= FDB (file format) =

File format

Font Definition Block (abbreviation: FDB, filename extension .fdb) is a file format for computer fonts used by the Ming library.

An FDB file is a wrapper containing an SWF DefineFont2 block which describes a font.
